

473001–473100 

|-bgcolor=#d6d6d6
| 473001 ||  || — || December 14, 2007 || Mount Lemmon || Mount Lemmon Survey || — || align=right | 3.1 km || 
|-id=002 bgcolor=#d6d6d6
| 473002 ||  || — || September 28, 1994 || Kitt Peak || Spacewatch || — || align=right | 3.8 km || 
|-id=003 bgcolor=#E9E9E9
| 473003 ||  || — || April 28, 2011 || Mount Lemmon || Mount Lemmon Survey || — || align=right | 1.4 km || 
|-id=004 bgcolor=#E9E9E9
| 473004 ||  || — || February 13, 2010 || Mount Lemmon || Mount Lemmon Survey || — || align=right | 1.5 km || 
|-id=005 bgcolor=#E9E9E9
| 473005 ||  || — || March 7, 1997 || Kitt Peak || Spacewatch || — || align=right | 1.9 km || 
|-id=006 bgcolor=#E9E9E9
| 473006 ||  || — || May 11, 2007 || Kitt Peak || Spacewatch || — || align=right data-sort-value="0.94" | 940 m || 
|-id=007 bgcolor=#fefefe
| 473007 ||  || — || January 8, 1999 || Kitt Peak || Spacewatch || — || align=right data-sort-value="0.98" | 980 m || 
|-id=008 bgcolor=#d6d6d6
| 473008 ||  || — || February 27, 2009 || Kitt Peak || Spacewatch || — || align=right | 3.2 km || 
|-id=009 bgcolor=#d6d6d6
| 473009 ||  || — || March 19, 2009 || Kitt Peak || Spacewatch || — || align=right | 2.8 km || 
|-id=010 bgcolor=#E9E9E9
| 473010 ||  || — || March 4, 2006 || Kitt Peak || Spacewatch || — || align=right | 1.6 km || 
|-id=011 bgcolor=#fefefe
| 473011 ||  || — || December 10, 2006 || Kitt Peak || Spacewatch || — || align=right data-sort-value="0.85" | 850 m || 
|-id=012 bgcolor=#d6d6d6
| 473012 ||  || — || September 13, 2005 || Kitt Peak || Spacewatch || — || align=right | 2.3 km || 
|-id=013 bgcolor=#fefefe
| 473013 ||  || — || September 28, 2003 || Kitt Peak || Spacewatch || — || align=right | 1.1 km || 
|-id=014 bgcolor=#fefefe
| 473014 ||  || — || August 8, 2004 || Socorro || LINEAR || NYS || align=right data-sort-value="0.94" | 940 m || 
|-id=015 bgcolor=#fefefe
| 473015 ||  || — || April 19, 1993 || Kitt Peak || Spacewatch || — || align=right data-sort-value="0.89" | 890 m || 
|-id=016 bgcolor=#fefefe
| 473016 ||  || — || November 18, 2001 || Socorro || LINEAR || — || align=right | 1.2 km || 
|-id=017 bgcolor=#d6d6d6
| 473017 ||  || — || November 13, 2006 || Kitt Peak || Spacewatch || — || align=right | 3.2 km || 
|-id=018 bgcolor=#d6d6d6
| 473018 ||  || — || July 24, 2000 || Kitt Peak || Spacewatch || EOS || align=right | 2.1 km || 
|-id=019 bgcolor=#d6d6d6
| 473019 ||  || — || November 7, 2007 || Kitt Peak || Spacewatch || EOS || align=right | 2.2 km || 
|-id=020 bgcolor=#E9E9E9
| 473020 ||  || — || March 11, 2005 || Mount Lemmon || Mount Lemmon Survey || — || align=right | 2.2 km || 
|-id=021 bgcolor=#d6d6d6
| 473021 ||  || — || July 6, 2005 || Kitt Peak || Spacewatch || — || align=right | 2.7 km || 
|-id=022 bgcolor=#d6d6d6
| 473022 ||  || — || December 15, 2007 || Kitt Peak || Spacewatch || — || align=right | 3.5 km || 
|-id=023 bgcolor=#d6d6d6
| 473023 ||  || — || April 21, 2004 || Kitt Peak || Spacewatch || EOS || align=right | 2.0 km || 
|-id=024 bgcolor=#E9E9E9
| 473024 ||  || — || November 29, 1992 || Kitt Peak || Spacewatch || — || align=right | 1.6 km || 
|-id=025 bgcolor=#E9E9E9
| 473025 ||  || — || April 28, 2011 || Kitt Peak || Spacewatch || — || align=right | 1.7 km || 
|-id=026 bgcolor=#E9E9E9
| 473026 ||  || — || June 11, 1997 || Kitt Peak || Spacewatch || — || align=right | 2.9 km || 
|-id=027 bgcolor=#E9E9E9
| 473027 ||  || — || October 9, 2007 || Mount Lemmon || Mount Lemmon Survey || AGN || align=right | 1.2 km || 
|-id=028 bgcolor=#E9E9E9
| 473028 ||  || — || April 18, 2007 || Kitt Peak || Spacewatch || — || align=right | 1.1 km || 
|-id=029 bgcolor=#E9E9E9
| 473029 ||  || — || September 24, 2008 || Mount Lemmon || Mount Lemmon Survey || — || align=right | 1.7 km || 
|-id=030 bgcolor=#d6d6d6
| 473030 ||  || — || April 20, 2004 || Kitt Peak || Spacewatch || — || align=right | 2.9 km || 
|-id=031 bgcolor=#d6d6d6
| 473031 ||  || — || February 3, 2009 || Mount Lemmon || Mount Lemmon Survey || — || align=right | 2.2 km || 
|-id=032 bgcolor=#d6d6d6
| 473032 ||  || — || October 24, 2007 || Mount Lemmon || Mount Lemmon Survey || — || align=right | 3.0 km || 
|-id=033 bgcolor=#E9E9E9
| 473033 ||  || — || November 17, 2009 || Kitt Peak || Spacewatch || — || align=right data-sort-value="0.81" | 810 m || 
|-id=034 bgcolor=#d6d6d6
| 473034 ||  || — || August 30, 2005 || Kitt Peak || Spacewatch || THM || align=right | 2.4 km || 
|-id=035 bgcolor=#d6d6d6
| 473035 ||  || — || November 2, 2007 || Kitt Peak || Spacewatch || KOR || align=right | 1.3 km || 
|-id=036 bgcolor=#fefefe
| 473036 ||  || — || September 23, 2009 || Mount Lemmon || Mount Lemmon Survey || — || align=right data-sort-value="0.73" | 730 m || 
|-id=037 bgcolor=#d6d6d6
| 473037 ||  || — || October 19, 2006 || Kitt Peak || Spacewatch || — || align=right | 2.8 km || 
|-id=038 bgcolor=#E9E9E9
| 473038 ||  || — || May 7, 2007 || Kitt Peak || Spacewatch || — || align=right | 1.2 km || 
|-id=039 bgcolor=#E9E9E9
| 473039 ||  || — || September 19, 2003 || Kitt Peak || Spacewatch || — || align=right | 1.8 km || 
|-id=040 bgcolor=#E9E9E9
| 473040 ||  || — || February 23, 2006 || Anderson Mesa || LONEOS || — || align=right | 1.6 km || 
|-id=041 bgcolor=#d6d6d6
| 473041 ||  || — || September 4, 2000 || Kitt Peak || Spacewatch || — || align=right | 2.5 km || 
|-id=042 bgcolor=#fefefe
| 473042 ||  || — || December 18, 2001 || Socorro || LINEAR || — || align=right | 1.1 km || 
|-id=043 bgcolor=#E9E9E9
| 473043 ||  || — || September 21, 2008 || Kitt Peak || Spacewatch || — || align=right | 1.3 km || 
|-id=044 bgcolor=#d6d6d6
| 473044 ||  || — || May 16, 2010 || Kitt Peak || Spacewatch || — || align=right | 2.6 km || 
|-id=045 bgcolor=#d6d6d6
| 473045 ||  || — || March 10, 2005 || Mount Lemmon || Mount Lemmon Survey || KOR || align=right | 1.3 km || 
|-id=046 bgcolor=#fefefe
| 473046 ||  || — || January 29, 2011 || Mount Lemmon || Mount Lemmon Survey || — || align=right data-sort-value="0.80" | 800 m || 
|-id=047 bgcolor=#d6d6d6
| 473047 ||  || — || March 23, 2003 || Kitt Peak || Spacewatch || HYG || align=right | 2.6 km || 
|-id=048 bgcolor=#d6d6d6
| 473048 ||  || — || October 16, 2006 || Kitt Peak || Spacewatch || — || align=right | 2.4 km || 
|-id=049 bgcolor=#d6d6d6
| 473049 ||  || — || October 16, 2006 || Kitt Peak || Spacewatch || — || align=right | 3.4 km || 
|-id=050 bgcolor=#d6d6d6
| 473050 ||  || — || January 16, 2009 || Mount Lemmon || Mount Lemmon Survey || — || align=right | 1.8 km || 
|-id=051 bgcolor=#E9E9E9
| 473051 ||  || — || November 3, 2004 || Kitt Peak || Spacewatch || — || align=right | 1.5 km || 
|-id=052 bgcolor=#E9E9E9
| 473052 ||  || — || February 14, 2010 || Catalina || CSS || — || align=right | 2.2 km || 
|-id=053 bgcolor=#d6d6d6
| 473053 ||  || — || October 9, 2012 || Mount Lemmon || Mount Lemmon Survey || — || align=right | 3.0 km || 
|-id=054 bgcolor=#fefefe
| 473054 ||  || — || March 5, 2008 || Mount Lemmon || Mount Lemmon Survey || — || align=right data-sort-value="0.61" | 610 m || 
|-id=055 bgcolor=#E9E9E9
| 473055 ||  || — || October 6, 2008 || Kitt Peak || Spacewatch || — || align=right | 1.5 km || 
|-id=056 bgcolor=#d6d6d6
| 473056 ||  || — || December 3, 2012 || Mount Lemmon || Mount Lemmon Survey || — || align=right | 3.2 km || 
|-id=057 bgcolor=#d6d6d6
| 473057 ||  || — || March 13, 2010 || WISE || WISE || — || align=right | 2.7 km || 
|-id=058 bgcolor=#d6d6d6
| 473058 ||  || — || August 24, 2001 || Kitt Peak || Spacewatch || 3:2 || align=right | 4.1 km || 
|-id=059 bgcolor=#E9E9E9
| 473059 ||  || — || May 6, 2006 || Mount Lemmon || Mount Lemmon Survey || — || align=right | 2.9 km || 
|-id=060 bgcolor=#d6d6d6
| 473060 ||  || — || September 18, 2011 || Mount Lemmon || Mount Lemmon Survey || THM || align=right | 2.2 km || 
|-id=061 bgcolor=#E9E9E9
| 473061 ||  || — || November 20, 2000 || Socorro || LINEAR || — || align=right | 2.1 km || 
|-id=062 bgcolor=#d6d6d6
| 473062 ||  || — || February 12, 2004 || Kitt Peak || Spacewatch || KOR || align=right | 1.7 km || 
|-id=063 bgcolor=#d6d6d6
| 473063 ||  || — || February 22, 2009 || Kitt Peak || Spacewatch || — || align=right | 2.1 km || 
|-id=064 bgcolor=#E9E9E9
| 473064 ||  || — || September 23, 2008 || Mount Lemmon || Mount Lemmon Survey || — || align=right | 1.6 km || 
|-id=065 bgcolor=#E9E9E9
| 473065 ||  || — || May 7, 2006 || Mount Lemmon || Mount Lemmon Survey || — || align=right | 2.2 km || 
|-id=066 bgcolor=#E9E9E9
| 473066 ||  || — || June 15, 2007 || Kitt Peak || Spacewatch || — || align=right | 2.1 km || 
|-id=067 bgcolor=#d6d6d6
| 473067 ||  || — || November 3, 2005 || Mount Lemmon || Mount Lemmon Survey || 7:4 || align=right | 4.2 km || 
|-id=068 bgcolor=#fefefe
| 473068 ||  || — || December 25, 2005 || Kitt Peak || Spacewatch || — || align=right data-sort-value="0.98" | 980 m || 
|-id=069 bgcolor=#d6d6d6
| 473069 ||  || — || April 14, 2010 || WISE || WISE || — || align=right | 4.5 km || 
|-id=070 bgcolor=#fefefe
| 473070 ||  || — || November 22, 2006 || Mount Lemmon || Mount Lemmon Survey || — || align=right data-sort-value="0.73" | 730 m || 
|-id=071 bgcolor=#fefefe
| 473071 ||  || — || December 25, 2005 || Mount Lemmon || Mount Lemmon Survey || — || align=right data-sort-value="0.93" | 930 m || 
|-id=072 bgcolor=#fefefe
| 473072 ||  || — || November 28, 2010 || Kitt Peak || Spacewatch || — || align=right data-sort-value="0.66" | 660 m || 
|-id=073 bgcolor=#d6d6d6
| 473073 ||  || — || December 1, 2008 || Mount Lemmon || Mount Lemmon Survey || — || align=right | 2.6 km || 
|-id=074 bgcolor=#d6d6d6
| 473074 ||  || — || September 15, 2006 || Kitt Peak || Spacewatch || — || align=right | 2.1 km || 
|-id=075 bgcolor=#fefefe
| 473075 ||  || — || March 3, 2005 || Catalina || CSS || — || align=right data-sort-value="0.73" | 730 m || 
|-id=076 bgcolor=#E9E9E9
| 473076 ||  || — || April 25, 2007 || Kitt Peak || Spacewatch || — || align=right data-sort-value="0.87" | 870 m || 
|-id=077 bgcolor=#E9E9E9
| 473077 ||  || — || December 20, 2009 || Mount Lemmon || Mount Lemmon Survey || — || align=right | 1.8 km || 
|-id=078 bgcolor=#E9E9E9
| 473078 ||  || — || October 8, 2012 || Catalina || CSS || — || align=right | 2.5 km || 
|-id=079 bgcolor=#E9E9E9
| 473079 ||  || — || September 14, 2007 || Catalina || CSS || — || align=right | 1.8 km || 
|-id=080 bgcolor=#C2FFFF
| 473080 ||  || — || January 7, 2011 || Kitt Peak || Spacewatch || L4 || align=right | 9.5 km || 
|-id=081 bgcolor=#E9E9E9
| 473081 ||  || — || April 24, 2006 || Kitt Peak || Spacewatch || — || align=right | 2.0 km || 
|-id=082 bgcolor=#E9E9E9
| 473082 ||  || — || November 1, 2008 || Mount Lemmon || Mount Lemmon Survey || — || align=right | 1.6 km || 
|-id=083 bgcolor=#d6d6d6
| 473083 ||  || — || April 15, 2010 || Mount Lemmon || Mount Lemmon Survey || — || align=right | 2.6 km || 
|-id=084 bgcolor=#fefefe
| 473084 ||  || — || March 10, 2005 || Mount Lemmon || Mount Lemmon Survey || — || align=right data-sort-value="0.84" | 840 m || 
|-id=085 bgcolor=#E9E9E9
| 473085 ||  || — || April 19, 2006 || Mount Lemmon || Mount Lemmon Survey || — || align=right | 2.4 km || 
|-id=086 bgcolor=#d6d6d6
| 473086 ||  || — || October 10, 2012 || Mount Lemmon || Mount Lemmon Survey || — || align=right | 2.3 km || 
|-id=087 bgcolor=#E9E9E9
| 473087 ||  || — || September 3, 1999 || Kitt Peak || Spacewatch || — || align=right | 1.4 km || 
|-id=088 bgcolor=#d6d6d6
| 473088 ||  || — || March 23, 1998 || Kitt Peak || Spacewatch || — || align=right | 2.7 km || 
|-id=089 bgcolor=#d6d6d6
| 473089 ||  || — || June 11, 2004 || Kitt Peak || Spacewatch || — || align=right | 3.2 km || 
|-id=090 bgcolor=#d6d6d6
| 473090 ||  || — || January 28, 2014 || Mount Lemmon || Mount Lemmon Survey || EOS || align=right | 1.6 km || 
|-id=091 bgcolor=#d6d6d6
| 473091 ||  || — || March 28, 2004 || Kitt Peak || Spacewatch || EOS || align=right | 2.0 km || 
|-id=092 bgcolor=#E9E9E9
| 473092 ||  || — || September 12, 2007 || Mount Lemmon || Mount Lemmon Survey || — || align=right | 2.8 km || 
|-id=093 bgcolor=#E9E9E9
| 473093 ||  || — || September 17, 2012 || Mount Lemmon || Mount Lemmon Survey || — || align=right | 2.0 km || 
|-id=094 bgcolor=#d6d6d6
| 473094 ||  || — || February 3, 2009 || Mount Lemmon || Mount Lemmon Survey || — || align=right | 2.7 km || 
|-id=095 bgcolor=#E9E9E9
| 473095 ||  || — || November 21, 2003 || Kitt Peak || Spacewatch || PAD || align=right | 1.9 km || 
|-id=096 bgcolor=#d6d6d6
| 473096 ||  || — || September 18, 2011 || Mount Lemmon || Mount Lemmon Survey || — || align=right | 2.4 km || 
|-id=097 bgcolor=#d6d6d6
| 473097 ||  || — || September 23, 2005 || Kitt Peak || Spacewatch || THM || align=right | 3.2 km || 
|-id=098 bgcolor=#d6d6d6
| 473098 ||  || — || November 13, 2007 || Mount Lemmon || Mount Lemmon Survey || — || align=right | 2.7 km || 
|-id=099 bgcolor=#fefefe
| 473099 ||  || — || March 11, 2007 || Kitt Peak || Spacewatch || — || align=right data-sort-value="0.87" | 870 m || 
|-id=100 bgcolor=#d6d6d6
| 473100 ||  || — || February 3, 2009 || Kitt Peak || Spacewatch || — || align=right | 2.2 km || 
|}

473101–473200 

|-bgcolor=#d6d6d6
| 473101 ||  || — || May 13, 2004 || Kitt Peak || Spacewatch || — || align=right | 2.7 km || 
|-id=102 bgcolor=#E9E9E9
| 473102 ||  || — || September 24, 2008 || Mount Lemmon || Mount Lemmon Survey || — || align=right | 1.5 km || 
|-id=103 bgcolor=#d6d6d6
| 473103 ||  || — || September 28, 2000 || Kitt Peak || Spacewatch || — || align=right | 3.4 km || 
|-id=104 bgcolor=#E9E9E9
| 473104 ||  || — || September 21, 2012 || Kitt Peak || Spacewatch || — || align=right | 1.9 km || 
|-id=105 bgcolor=#E9E9E9
| 473105 ||  || — || October 25, 2008 || Kitt Peak || Spacewatch || — || align=right | 2.5 km || 
|-id=106 bgcolor=#d6d6d6
| 473106 ||  || — || May 15, 2004 || Siding Spring || SSS || — || align=right | 2.6 km || 
|-id=107 bgcolor=#fefefe
| 473107 ||  || — || October 27, 2005 || Mount Lemmon || Mount Lemmon Survey || — || align=right data-sort-value="0.77" | 770 m || 
|-id=108 bgcolor=#fefefe
| 473108 ||  || — || October 27, 2005 || Kitt Peak || Spacewatch || — || align=right data-sort-value="0.84" | 840 m || 
|-id=109 bgcolor=#E9E9E9
| 473109 ||  || — || December 30, 2005 || Kitt Peak || Spacewatch || — || align=right | 1.1 km || 
|-id=110 bgcolor=#E9E9E9
| 473110 ||  || — || February 24, 2006 || Catalina || CSS || — || align=right | 1.9 km || 
|-id=111 bgcolor=#E9E9E9
| 473111 ||  || — || December 21, 2008 || Mount Lemmon || Mount Lemmon Survey || MRX || align=right | 1.2 km || 
|-id=112 bgcolor=#d6d6d6
| 473112 ||  || — || March 3, 2009 || Catalina || CSS || — || align=right | 4.2 km || 
|-id=113 bgcolor=#d6d6d6
| 473113 ||  || — || January 18, 2008 || Mount Lemmon || Mount Lemmon Survey || — || align=right | 3.7 km || 
|-id=114 bgcolor=#d6d6d6
| 473114 ||  || — || February 24, 2010 || WISE || WISE || — || align=right | 2.7 km || 
|-id=115 bgcolor=#d6d6d6
| 473115 ||  || — || November 12, 2012 || Mount Lemmon || Mount Lemmon Survey || VER || align=right | 3.4 km || 
|-id=116 bgcolor=#d6d6d6
| 473116 ||  || — || April 16, 2004 || Kitt Peak || Spacewatch || — || align=right | 2.9 km || 
|-id=117 bgcolor=#E9E9E9
| 473117 ||  || — || April 18, 1998 || Kitt Peak || Spacewatch || — || align=right | 1.6 km || 
|-id=118 bgcolor=#d6d6d6
| 473118 ||  || — || August 11, 2004 || Campo Imperatore || CINEOS || Tj (2.97) || align=right | 3.3 km || 
|-id=119 bgcolor=#fefefe
| 473119 ||  || — || August 29, 2006 || Kitt Peak || Spacewatch || — || align=right data-sort-value="0.76" | 760 m || 
|-id=120 bgcolor=#d6d6d6
| 473120 ||  || — || November 9, 2007 || Kitt Peak || Spacewatch || — || align=right | 3.2 km || 
|-id=121 bgcolor=#fefefe
| 473121 ||  || — || December 13, 2006 || Kitt Peak || Spacewatch || NYS || align=right data-sort-value="0.72" | 720 m || 
|-id=122 bgcolor=#E9E9E9
| 473122 ||  || — || January 28, 2006 || Catalina || CSS || — || align=right | 2.1 km || 
|-id=123 bgcolor=#d6d6d6
| 473123 ||  || — || June 20, 2010 || Mount Lemmon || Mount Lemmon Survey || — || align=right | 3.3 km || 
|-id=124 bgcolor=#d6d6d6
| 473124 ||  || — || March 15, 2004 || Kitt Peak || Spacewatch || EOS || align=right | 1.9 km || 
|-id=125 bgcolor=#d6d6d6
| 473125 ||  || — || January 31, 2010 || WISE || WISE || — || align=right | 3.4 km || 
|-id=126 bgcolor=#d6d6d6
| 473126 ||  || — || September 18, 2011 || Catalina || CSS || — || align=right | 3.8 km || 
|-id=127 bgcolor=#d6d6d6
| 473127 ||  || — || October 15, 2012 || Catalina || CSS || — || align=right | 3.7 km || 
|-id=128 bgcolor=#E9E9E9
| 473128 ||  || — || October 28, 2008 || Mount Lemmon || Mount Lemmon Survey || — || align=right | 2.0 km || 
|-id=129 bgcolor=#d6d6d6
| 473129 ||  || — || January 10, 2008 || Mount Lemmon || Mount Lemmon Survey || — || align=right | 3.3 km || 
|-id=130 bgcolor=#d6d6d6
| 473130 ||  || — || December 5, 2007 || Kitt Peak || Spacewatch || — || align=right | 3.0 km || 
|-id=131 bgcolor=#d6d6d6
| 473131 ||  || — || November 17, 2006 || Mount Lemmon || Mount Lemmon Survey || VER || align=right | 2.7 km || 
|-id=132 bgcolor=#E9E9E9
| 473132 ||  || — || September 29, 2003 || Kitt Peak || Spacewatch || — || align=right | 2.3 km || 
|-id=133 bgcolor=#d6d6d6
| 473133 ||  || — || December 25, 2013 || Mount Lemmon || Mount Lemmon Survey || — || align=right | 2.6 km || 
|-id=134 bgcolor=#d6d6d6
| 473134 ||  || — || April 28, 2010 || WISE || WISE || URS || align=right | 3.1 km || 
|-id=135 bgcolor=#E9E9E9
| 473135 ||  || — || December 18, 2009 || Mount Lemmon || Mount Lemmon Survey || — || align=right | 3.1 km || 
|-id=136 bgcolor=#d6d6d6
| 473136 ||  || — || April 21, 2010 || WISE || WISE || — || align=right | 3.5 km || 
|-id=137 bgcolor=#E9E9E9
| 473137 ||  || — || September 12, 2007 || Kitt Peak || Spacewatch || AGN || align=right | 1.4 km || 
|-id=138 bgcolor=#E9E9E9
| 473138 ||  || — || October 10, 2008 || Mount Lemmon || Mount Lemmon Survey || — || align=right | 1.3 km || 
|-id=139 bgcolor=#d6d6d6
| 473139 ||  || — || September 17, 2006 || Catalina || CSS || — || align=right | 5.1 km || 
|-id=140 bgcolor=#fefefe
| 473140 ||  || — || December 13, 2006 || Kitt Peak || Spacewatch || V || align=right data-sort-value="0.87" | 870 m || 
|-id=141 bgcolor=#d6d6d6
| 473141 ||  || — || September 10, 2007 || Mount Lemmon || Mount Lemmon Survey || — || align=right | 2.5 km || 
|-id=142 bgcolor=#d6d6d6
| 473142 ||  || — || August 26, 2011 || Kitt Peak || Spacewatch || — || align=right | 3.1 km || 
|-id=143 bgcolor=#d6d6d6
| 473143 ||  || — || January 16, 2008 || Kitt Peak || Spacewatch || — || align=right | 2.8 km || 
|-id=144 bgcolor=#d6d6d6
| 473144 ||  || — || December 4, 2007 || Catalina || CSS || — || align=right | 3.7 km || 
|-id=145 bgcolor=#d6d6d6
| 473145 ||  || — || March 11, 2010 || WISE || WISE || — || align=right | 5.0 km || 
|-id=146 bgcolor=#d6d6d6
| 473146 ||  || — || June 19, 2010 || Mount Lemmon || Mount Lemmon Survey || — || align=right | 2.8 km || 
|-id=147 bgcolor=#d6d6d6
| 473147 ||  || — || June 14, 2005 || Mount Lemmon || Mount Lemmon Survey || — || align=right | 4.5 km || 
|-id=148 bgcolor=#d6d6d6
| 473148 ||  || — || February 11, 2014 || Mount Lemmon || Mount Lemmon Survey || EOS || align=right | 1.9 km || 
|-id=149 bgcolor=#E9E9E9
| 473149 ||  || — || January 8, 2010 || Mount Lemmon || Mount Lemmon Survey || — || align=right | 2.8 km || 
|-id=150 bgcolor=#d6d6d6
| 473150 ||  || — || January 11, 2008 || Mount Lemmon || Mount Lemmon Survey || — || align=right | 3.2 km || 
|-id=151 bgcolor=#d6d6d6
| 473151 ||  || — || September 23, 2011 || Kitt Peak || Spacewatch || — || align=right | 3.3 km || 
|-id=152 bgcolor=#d6d6d6
| 473152 ||  || — || September 14, 2006 || Kitt Peak || Spacewatch || EOS || align=right | 1.9 km || 
|-id=153 bgcolor=#d6d6d6
| 473153 ||  || — || July 10, 2005 || Kitt Peak || Spacewatch || — || align=right | 3.9 km || 
|-id=154 bgcolor=#E9E9E9
| 473154 ||  || — || February 23, 2006 || Anderson Mesa || LONEOS || — || align=right | 1.4 km || 
|-id=155 bgcolor=#d6d6d6
| 473155 ||  || — || December 31, 2013 || Kitt Peak || Spacewatch || — || align=right | 3.4 km || 
|-id=156 bgcolor=#d6d6d6
| 473156 ||  || — || February 26, 2008 || Kitt Peak || Spacewatch || EOS || align=right | 1.7 km || 
|-id=157 bgcolor=#fefefe
| 473157 ||  || — || December 31, 1999 || Kitt Peak || Spacewatch || — || align=right data-sort-value="0.72" | 720 m || 
|-id=158 bgcolor=#E9E9E9
| 473158 ||  || — || May 22, 2011 || Mount Lemmon || Mount Lemmon Survey || — || align=right | 1.1 km || 
|-id=159 bgcolor=#E9E9E9
| 473159 ||  || — || October 22, 2012 || Mount Lemmon || Mount Lemmon Survey || AGN || align=right | 1.2 km || 
|-id=160 bgcolor=#E9E9E9
| 473160 ||  || — || September 17, 2003 || Kitt Peak || Spacewatch || — || align=right | 1.3 km || 
|-id=161 bgcolor=#d6d6d6
| 473161 ||  || — || October 13, 2012 || Kitt Peak || Spacewatch ||  || align=right | 3.7 km || 
|-id=162 bgcolor=#d6d6d6
| 473162 ||  || — || November 19, 2006 || Kitt Peak || Spacewatch || — || align=right | 2.8 km || 
|-id=163 bgcolor=#d6d6d6
| 473163 ||  || — || October 21, 2006 || Kitt Peak || Spacewatch || — || align=right | 2.3 km || 
|-id=164 bgcolor=#E9E9E9
| 473164 ||  || — || November 20, 2003 || Socorro || LINEAR || — || align=right | 2.9 km || 
|-id=165 bgcolor=#d6d6d6
| 473165 ||  || — || April 22, 2009 || Mount Lemmon || Mount Lemmon Survey || — || align=right | 2.8 km || 
|-id=166 bgcolor=#d6d6d6
| 473166 ||  || — || November 19, 2006 || Kitt Peak || Spacewatch || HYG || align=right | 2.7 km || 
|-id=167 bgcolor=#d6d6d6
| 473167 ||  || — || November 4, 2012 || Mount Lemmon || Mount Lemmon Survey || — || align=right | 2.6 km || 
|-id=168 bgcolor=#d6d6d6
| 473168 ||  || — || April 20, 2009 || Mount Lemmon || Mount Lemmon Survey || — || align=right | 3.0 km || 
|-id=169 bgcolor=#E9E9E9
| 473169 ||  || — || October 23, 2008 || Mount Lemmon || Mount Lemmon Survey || EUN || align=right | 1.0 km || 
|-id=170 bgcolor=#E9E9E9
| 473170 ||  || — || September 20, 2008 || Kitt Peak || Spacewatch || RAF || align=right | 1.4 km || 
|-id=171 bgcolor=#d6d6d6
| 473171 ||  || — || March 1, 2008 || Mount Lemmon || Mount Lemmon Survey || — || align=right | 3.1 km || 
|-id=172 bgcolor=#d6d6d6
| 473172 ||  || — || August 19, 2006 || Kitt Peak || Spacewatch || KOR || align=right | 1.2 km || 
|-id=173 bgcolor=#fefefe
| 473173 ||  || — || December 15, 2006 || Kitt Peak || Spacewatch || — || align=right data-sort-value="0.80" | 800 m || 
|-id=174 bgcolor=#E9E9E9
| 473174 ||  || — || October 30, 2007 || Mount Lemmon || Mount Lemmon Survey || — || align=right | 2.5 km || 
|-id=175 bgcolor=#d6d6d6
| 473175 ||  || — || November 20, 2006 || Kitt Peak || Spacewatch || VER || align=right | 2.7 km || 
|-id=176 bgcolor=#d6d6d6
| 473176 ||  || — || December 31, 2002 || Socorro || LINEAR || Tj (2.99) || align=right | 5.1 km || 
|-id=177 bgcolor=#d6d6d6
| 473177 ||  || — || April 17, 2010 || WISE || WISE || — || align=right | 4.3 km || 
|-id=178 bgcolor=#E9E9E9
| 473178 ||  || — || March 25, 2006 || Kitt Peak || Spacewatch || — || align=right | 2.8 km || 
|-id=179 bgcolor=#d6d6d6
| 473179 ||  || — || April 17, 2005 || Kitt Peak || Spacewatch || — || align=right | 3.1 km || 
|-id=180 bgcolor=#d6d6d6
| 473180 ||  || — || November 15, 2007 || Mount Lemmon || Mount Lemmon Survey || — || align=right | 3.0 km || 
|-id=181 bgcolor=#fefefe
| 473181 ||  || — || April 30, 2004 || Kitt Peak || Spacewatch || — || align=right data-sort-value="0.98" | 980 m || 
|-id=182 bgcolor=#E9E9E9
| 473182 ||  || — || January 9, 2014 || Mount Lemmon || Mount Lemmon Survey || — || align=right | 2.0 km || 
|-id=183 bgcolor=#E9E9E9
| 473183 ||  || — || May 8, 1994 || Kitt Peak || Spacewatch || — || align=right | 2.6 km || 
|-id=184 bgcolor=#d6d6d6
| 473184 ||  || — || February 10, 2008 || Kitt Peak || Spacewatch || 7:4 || align=right | 2.8 km || 
|-id=185 bgcolor=#d6d6d6
| 473185 ||  || — || February 20, 2014 || Mount Lemmon || Mount Lemmon Survey || — || align=right | 2.5 km || 
|-id=186 bgcolor=#d6d6d6
| 473186 ||  || — || January 17, 2009 || Kitt Peak || Spacewatch || — || align=right | 2.8 km || 
|-id=187 bgcolor=#E9E9E9
| 473187 ||  || — || October 26, 2008 || Mount Lemmon || Mount Lemmon Survey || — || align=right | 2.3 km || 
|-id=188 bgcolor=#d6d6d6
| 473188 ||  || — || February 7, 2008 || Mount Lemmon || Mount Lemmon Survey || 7:4 || align=right | 2.8 km || 
|-id=189 bgcolor=#d6d6d6
| 473189 ||  || — || March 17, 2009 || Kitt Peak || Spacewatch || — || align=right | 3.5 km || 
|-id=190 bgcolor=#d6d6d6
| 473190 ||  || — || November 15, 2007 || Catalina || CSS || — || align=right | 2.5 km || 
|-id=191 bgcolor=#d6d6d6
| 473191 ||  || — || October 30, 2005 || Kitt Peak || Spacewatch || — || align=right | 3.0 km || 
|-id=192 bgcolor=#d6d6d6
| 473192 ||  || — || October 20, 2012 || Mount Lemmon || Mount Lemmon Survey || — || align=right | 3.1 km || 
|-id=193 bgcolor=#d6d6d6
| 473193 ||  || — || March 1, 2009 || Kitt Peak || Spacewatch || EOS || align=right | 1.5 km || 
|-id=194 bgcolor=#d6d6d6
| 473194 ||  || — || December 31, 2007 || Kitt Peak || Spacewatch || — || align=right | 3.2 km || 
|-id=195 bgcolor=#d6d6d6
| 473195 ||  || — || January 11, 2008 || Mount Lemmon || Mount Lemmon Survey || — || align=right | 2.6 km || 
|-id=196 bgcolor=#d6d6d6
| 473196 ||  || — || February 26, 2009 || Kitt Peak || Spacewatch || TEL || align=right | 1.4 km || 
|-id=197 bgcolor=#d6d6d6
| 473197 ||  || — || December 15, 2006 || Kitt Peak || Spacewatch || — || align=right | 4.4 km || 
|-id=198 bgcolor=#d6d6d6
| 473198 ||  || — || December 30, 2007 || Kitt Peak || Spacewatch || EOS || align=right | 1.9 km || 
|-id=199 bgcolor=#d6d6d6
| 473199 ||  || — || April 27, 2010 || WISE || WISE || — || align=right | 2.9 km || 
|-id=200 bgcolor=#d6d6d6
| 473200 ||  || — || December 16, 2007 || Mount Lemmon || Mount Lemmon Survey || — || align=right | 3.4 km || 
|}

473201–473300 

|-bgcolor=#d6d6d6
| 473201 ||  || — || January 30, 2009 || Mount Lemmon || Mount Lemmon Survey || EOS || align=right | 1.6 km || 
|-id=202 bgcolor=#d6d6d6
| 473202 ||  || — || April 23, 2004 || Kitt Peak || Spacewatch || — || align=right | 3.0 km || 
|-id=203 bgcolor=#d6d6d6
| 473203 ||  || — || November 15, 2006 || Mount Lemmon || Mount Lemmon Survey || EOS || align=right | 2.3 km || 
|-id=204 bgcolor=#E9E9E9
| 473204 ||  || — || January 18, 2010 || WISE || WISE || — || align=right | 2.7 km || 
|-id=205 bgcolor=#d6d6d6
| 473205 ||  || — || February 9, 2008 || Kitt Peak || Spacewatch || VER || align=right | 2.6 km || 
|-id=206 bgcolor=#d6d6d6
| 473206 ||  || — || September 26, 1995 || Kitt Peak || Spacewatch || EOS || align=right | 1.6 km || 
|-id=207 bgcolor=#d6d6d6
| 473207 ||  || — || March 19, 2009 || Kitt Peak || Spacewatch || — || align=right | 3.1 km || 
|-id=208 bgcolor=#d6d6d6
| 473208 ||  || — || November 12, 2010 || Mount Lemmon || Mount Lemmon Survey || 3:2 || align=right | 4.2 km || 
|-id=209 bgcolor=#d6d6d6
| 473209 ||  || — || April 3, 2010 || WISE || WISE || — || align=right | 3.6 km || 
|-id=210 bgcolor=#d6d6d6
| 473210 ||  || — || September 28, 2009 || Kitt Peak || Spacewatch || 3:2 || align=right | 4.0 km || 
|-id=211 bgcolor=#d6d6d6
| 473211 ||  || — || January 20, 2009 || Catalina || CSS || TIR || align=right | 3.4 km || 
|-id=212 bgcolor=#d6d6d6
| 473212 ||  || — || November 8, 2007 || Mount Lemmon || Mount Lemmon Survey || EOS || align=right | 1.7 km || 
|-id=213 bgcolor=#d6d6d6
| 473213 ||  || — || March 1, 2009 || Mount Lemmon || Mount Lemmon Survey || — || align=right | 2.9 km || 
|-id=214 bgcolor=#E9E9E9
| 473214 ||  || — || January 25, 2006 || Kitt Peak || Spacewatch || — || align=right data-sort-value="0.94" | 940 m || 
|-id=215 bgcolor=#d6d6d6
| 473215 ||  || — || January 1, 2009 || Kitt Peak || Spacewatch || — || align=right | 2.5 km || 
|-id=216 bgcolor=#d6d6d6
| 473216 ||  || — || May 8, 2005 || Kitt Peak || Spacewatch || — || align=right | 2.5 km || 
|-id=217 bgcolor=#E9E9E9
| 473217 ||  || — || September 12, 2007 || Mount Lemmon || Mount Lemmon Survey || — || align=right | 1.5 km || 
|-id=218 bgcolor=#d6d6d6
| 473218 ||  || — || November 24, 2006 || Kitt Peak || Spacewatch || VER || align=right | 4.5 km || 
|-id=219 bgcolor=#E9E9E9
| 473219 ||  || — || November 29, 2005 || Mount Lemmon || Mount Lemmon Survey || — || align=right | 1.7 km || 
|-id=220 bgcolor=#fefefe
| 473220 ||  || — || November 29, 2003 || Kitt Peak || Spacewatch || — || align=right data-sort-value="0.75" | 750 m || 
|-id=221 bgcolor=#E9E9E9
| 473221 ||  || — || January 28, 2006 || Kitt Peak || Spacewatch || — || align=right data-sort-value="0.94" | 940 m || 
|-id=222 bgcolor=#E9E9E9
| 473222 ||  || — || May 25, 2006 || Mount Lemmon || Mount Lemmon Survey || MRX || align=right data-sort-value="0.99" | 990 m || 
|-id=223 bgcolor=#E9E9E9
| 473223 ||  || — || October 8, 2012 || Kitt Peak || Spacewatch || — || align=right | 2.0 km || 
|-id=224 bgcolor=#d6d6d6
| 473224 ||  || — || October 21, 1995 || Kitt Peak || Spacewatch || — || align=right | 4.5 km || 
|-id=225 bgcolor=#d6d6d6
| 473225 ||  || — || September 27, 2006 || Kitt Peak || Spacewatch || — || align=right | 2.5 km || 
|-id=226 bgcolor=#d6d6d6
| 473226 ||  || — || February 10, 2014 || Mount Lemmon || Mount Lemmon Survey || — || align=right | 2.8 km || 
|-id=227 bgcolor=#d6d6d6
| 473227 ||  || — || May 13, 2009 || Kitt Peak || Spacewatch || — || align=right | 3.4 km || 
|-id=228 bgcolor=#d6d6d6
| 473228 ||  || — || February 10, 2008 || Mount Lemmon || Mount Lemmon Survey || — || align=right | 4.3 km || 
|-id=229 bgcolor=#d6d6d6
| 473229 ||  || — || April 14, 2004 || Kitt Peak || Spacewatch || — || align=right | 2.5 km || 
|-id=230 bgcolor=#fefefe
| 473230 ||  || — || August 4, 2008 || Siding Spring || SSS || — || align=right | 1.2 km || 
|-id=231 bgcolor=#d6d6d6
| 473231 ||  || — || January 11, 2008 || Kitt Peak || Spacewatch || — || align=right | 4.5 km || 
|-id=232 bgcolor=#d6d6d6
| 473232 ||  || — || January 31, 2009 || Mount Lemmon || Mount Lemmon Survey || Tj (2.99) || align=right | 3.9 km || 
|-id=233 bgcolor=#fefefe
| 473233 ||  || — || September 7, 2004 || Kitt Peak || Spacewatch || — || align=right data-sort-value="0.87" | 870 m || 
|-id=234 bgcolor=#E9E9E9
| 473234 ||  || — || February 27, 2006 || Kitt Peak || Spacewatch || — || align=right | 2.0 km || 
|-id=235 bgcolor=#E9E9E9
| 473235 ||  || — || October 5, 2003 || Kitt Peak || Spacewatch || — || align=right | 2.0 km || 
|-id=236 bgcolor=#E9E9E9
| 473236 ||  || — || December 25, 2009 || Kitt Peak || Spacewatch || — || align=right | 1.3 km || 
|-id=237 bgcolor=#d6d6d6
| 473237 ||  || — || July 3, 2005 || Mount Lemmon || Mount Lemmon Survey || EOS || align=right | 2.1 km || 
|-id=238 bgcolor=#d6d6d6
| 473238 ||  || — || November 17, 2006 || Kitt Peak || Spacewatch || — || align=right | 3.5 km || 
|-id=239 bgcolor=#d6d6d6
| 473239 ||  || — || July 25, 2008 || Siding Spring || SSS || 3:2 || align=right | 5.4 km || 
|-id=240 bgcolor=#fefefe
| 473240 ||  || — || November 29, 2005 || Catalina || CSS || — || align=right | 1.2 km || 
|-id=241 bgcolor=#d6d6d6
| 473241 ||  || — || March 15, 2004 || Kitt Peak || Spacewatch || — || align=right | 2.7 km || 
|-id=242 bgcolor=#d6d6d6
| 473242 ||  || — || November 22, 2000 || Kitt Peak || Spacewatch || — || align=right | 3.1 km || 
|-id=243 bgcolor=#d6d6d6
| 473243 ||  || — || May 25, 2010 || Mount Lemmon || Mount Lemmon Survey || — || align=right | 3.3 km || 
|-id=244 bgcolor=#E9E9E9
| 473244 ||  || — || November 7, 2008 || Mount Lemmon || Mount Lemmon Survey || EUN || align=right | 1.4 km || 
|-id=245 bgcolor=#d6d6d6
| 473245 ||  || — || November 11, 2006 || Mount Lemmon || Mount Lemmon Survey || — || align=right | 3.5 km || 
|-id=246 bgcolor=#d6d6d6
| 473246 ||  || — || May 23, 2010 || WISE || WISE || THB || align=right | 3.6 km || 
|-id=247 bgcolor=#d6d6d6
| 473247 ||  || — || January 10, 2008 || Mount Lemmon || Mount Lemmon Survey || EOS || align=right | 2.0 km || 
|-id=248 bgcolor=#E9E9E9
| 473248 ||  || — || September 16, 2003 || Kitt Peak || Spacewatch || — || align=right | 2.1 km || 
|-id=249 bgcolor=#E9E9E9
| 473249 ||  || — || November 7, 2008 || Mount Lemmon || Mount Lemmon Survey || — || align=right | 1.8 km || 
|-id=250 bgcolor=#d6d6d6
| 473250 ||  || — || January 13, 2008 || Kitt Peak || Spacewatch || — || align=right | 2.6 km || 
|-id=251 bgcolor=#d6d6d6
| 473251 ||  || — || December 4, 2012 || Mount Lemmon || Mount Lemmon Survey || EOS || align=right | 1.9 km || 
|-id=252 bgcolor=#d6d6d6
| 473252 ||  || — || February 14, 2013 || Kitt Peak || Spacewatch || — || align=right | 3.1 km || 
|-id=253 bgcolor=#d6d6d6
| 473253 ||  || — || March 11, 2008 || Mount Lemmon || Mount Lemmon Survey || — || align=right | 3.7 km || 
|-id=254 bgcolor=#E9E9E9
| 473254 ||  || — || March 21, 2002 || Kitt Peak || Spacewatch || — || align=right | 1.5 km || 
|-id=255 bgcolor=#E9E9E9
| 473255 ||  || — || March 29, 2010 || WISE || WISE || — || align=right | 2.2 km || 
|-id=256 bgcolor=#E9E9E9
| 473256 ||  || — || November 6, 2012 || Mount Lemmon || Mount Lemmon Survey || HOF || align=right | 2.1 km || 
|-id=257 bgcolor=#d6d6d6
| 473257 ||  || — || March 16, 2004 || Kitt Peak || Spacewatch || — || align=right | 3.3 km || 
|-id=258 bgcolor=#d6d6d6
| 473258 ||  || — || March 18, 2009 || Kitt Peak || Spacewatch || VER || align=right | 2.4 km || 
|-id=259 bgcolor=#d6d6d6
| 473259 ||  || — || September 28, 2006 || Catalina || CSS || EOS || align=right | 2.2 km || 
|-id=260 bgcolor=#E9E9E9
| 473260 ||  || — || March 18, 2010 || Kitt Peak || Spacewatch || — || align=right | 2.0 km || 
|-id=261 bgcolor=#d6d6d6
| 473261 ||  || — || September 17, 2009 || Kitt Peak || Spacewatch || 3:2 || align=right | 4.1 km || 
|-id=262 bgcolor=#d6d6d6
| 473262 ||  || — || November 13, 2006 || Catalina || CSS || — || align=right | 3.4 km || 
|-id=263 bgcolor=#d6d6d6
| 473263 ||  || — || January 19, 2008 || Mount Lemmon || Mount Lemmon Survey || — || align=right | 3.5 km || 
|-id=264 bgcolor=#d6d6d6
| 473264 ||  || — || June 18, 2006 || Kitt Peak || Spacewatch || — || align=right | 2.6 km || 
|-id=265 bgcolor=#d6d6d6
| 473265 ||  || — || September 19, 2006 || Catalina || CSS || EOS || align=right | 2.2 km || 
|-id=266 bgcolor=#d6d6d6
| 473266 ||  || — || November 21, 2006 || Mount Lemmon || Mount Lemmon Survey || — || align=right | 6.5 km || 
|-id=267 bgcolor=#d6d6d6
| 473267 ||  || — || April 2, 2009 || Kitt Peak || Spacewatch || LIX || align=right | 3.0 km || 
|-id=268 bgcolor=#d6d6d6
| 473268 ||  || — || January 1, 2003 || Kitt Peak || Spacewatch || — || align=right | 2.7 km || 
|-id=269 bgcolor=#E9E9E9
| 473269 ||  || — || October 16, 2007 || Mount Lemmon || Mount Lemmon Survey || — || align=right | 2.0 km || 
|-id=270 bgcolor=#d6d6d6
| 473270 ||  || — || November 12, 2012 || Catalina || CSS || — || align=right | 3.2 km || 
|-id=271 bgcolor=#d6d6d6
| 473271 ||  || — || December 16, 2007 || Catalina || CSS || BRA || align=right | 2.1 km || 
|-id=272 bgcolor=#d6d6d6
| 473272 ||  || — || April 3, 2010 || WISE || WISE || — || align=right | 4.3 km || 
|-id=273 bgcolor=#d6d6d6
| 473273 ||  || — || January 1, 2008 || Kitt Peak || Spacewatch || — || align=right | 2.8 km || 
|-id=274 bgcolor=#d6d6d6
| 473274 ||  || — || December 4, 2012 || Mount Lemmon || Mount Lemmon Survey || — || align=right | 2.9 km || 
|-id=275 bgcolor=#d6d6d6
| 473275 ||  || — || November 13, 2006 || Catalina || CSS || — || align=right | 4.4 km || 
|-id=276 bgcolor=#d6d6d6
| 473276 ||  || — || March 8, 2008 || Mount Lemmon || Mount Lemmon Survey || — || align=right | 3.2 km || 
|-id=277 bgcolor=#d6d6d6
| 473277 ||  || — || January 27, 2010 || WISE || WISE || — || align=right | 3.2 km || 
|-id=278 bgcolor=#d6d6d6
| 473278 ||  || — || January 9, 2014 || Mount Lemmon || Mount Lemmon Survey || — || align=right | 3.1 km || 
|-id=279 bgcolor=#d6d6d6
| 473279 ||  || — || January 10, 2008 || Catalina || CSS || — || align=right | 4.6 km || 
|-id=280 bgcolor=#d6d6d6
| 473280 ||  || — || March 12, 2003 || Kitt Peak || Spacewatch || — || align=right | 2.6 km || 
|-id=281 bgcolor=#d6d6d6
| 473281 ||  || — || May 7, 2005 || Mount Lemmon || Mount Lemmon Survey || — || align=right | 2.7 km || 
|-id=282 bgcolor=#d6d6d6
| 473282 ||  || — || December 3, 2010 || Mount Lemmon || Mount Lemmon Survey || 3:2 || align=right | 6.1 km || 
|-id=283 bgcolor=#E9E9E9
| 473283 ||  || — || September 16, 2006 || Kitt Peak || Spacewatch || — || align=right | 1.9 km || 
|-id=284 bgcolor=#E9E9E9
| 473284 ||  || — || September 20, 2001 || Socorro || LINEAR || MRX || align=right data-sort-value="0.92" | 920 m || 
|-id=285 bgcolor=#fefefe
| 473285 ||  || — || June 26, 2007 || Kitt Peak || Spacewatch || — || align=right data-sort-value="0.94" | 940 m || 
|-id=286 bgcolor=#d6d6d6
| 473286 ||  || — || February 8, 2007 || Kitt Peak || Spacewatch || EOS || align=right | 2.7 km || 
|-id=287 bgcolor=#d6d6d6
| 473287 ||  || — || April 30, 2009 || Kitt Peak || Spacewatch || — || align=right | 2.7 km || 
|-id=288 bgcolor=#d6d6d6
| 473288 ||  || — || October 28, 2010 || Mount Lemmon || Mount Lemmon Survey || LIX || align=right | 3.0 km || 
|-id=289 bgcolor=#fefefe
| 473289 ||  || — || April 24, 2011 || Mount Lemmon || Mount Lemmon Survey || — || align=right data-sort-value="0.71" | 710 m || 
|-id=290 bgcolor=#d6d6d6
| 473290 ||  || — || August 10, 2004 || Socorro || LINEAR || Tj (2.94) || align=right | 3.2 km || 
|-id=291 bgcolor=#fefefe
| 473291 ||  || — || March 20, 2010 || Mount Lemmon || Mount Lemmon Survey || — || align=right data-sort-value="0.97" | 970 m || 
|-id=292 bgcolor=#E9E9E9
| 473292 ||  || — || February 5, 2009 || Kitt Peak || Spacewatch || — || align=right | 2.4 km || 
|-id=293 bgcolor=#fefefe
| 473293 ||  || — || November 2, 2000 || Kitt Peak || Spacewatch || — || align=right | 1.3 km || 
|-id=294 bgcolor=#d6d6d6
| 473294 ||  || — || November 22, 2006 || Mount Lemmon || Mount Lemmon Survey || — || align=right | 3.3 km || 
|-id=295 bgcolor=#E9E9E9
| 473295 ||  || — || May 7, 2006 || Kitt Peak || Spacewatch || EUN || align=right | 1.5 km || 
|-id=296 bgcolor=#fefefe
| 473296 ||  || — || November 3, 2005 || Mount Lemmon || Mount Lemmon Survey || — || align=right data-sort-value="0.76" | 760 m || 
|-id=297 bgcolor=#E9E9E9
| 473297 ||  || — || September 20, 2003 || Kitt Peak || Spacewatch || KON || align=right | 3.2 km || 
|-id=298 bgcolor=#d6d6d6
| 473298 ||  || — || September 9, 2004 || Kitt Peak || Spacewatch || — || align=right | 3.5 km || 
|-id=299 bgcolor=#fefefe
| 473299 ||  || — || November 9, 2004 || Catalina || CSS || — || align=right | 1.0 km || 
|-id=300 bgcolor=#fefefe
| 473300 ||  || — || January 28, 2000 || Kitt Peak || Spacewatch || — || align=right data-sort-value="0.84" | 840 m || 
|}

473301–473400 

|-bgcolor=#fefefe
| 473301 ||  || — || September 24, 2000 || Anderson Mesa || LONEOS || V || align=right data-sort-value="0.74" | 740 m || 
|-id=302 bgcolor=#fefefe
| 473302 ||  || — || September 15, 2004 || Kitt Peak || Spacewatch || MAS || align=right data-sort-value="0.77" | 770 m || 
|-id=303 bgcolor=#d6d6d6
| 473303 ||  || — || September 17, 2010 || Mount Lemmon || Mount Lemmon Survey || — || align=right | 2.5 km || 
|-id=304 bgcolor=#d6d6d6
| 473304 ||  || — || April 25, 2003 || Kitt Peak || Spacewatch || — || align=right | 3.3 km || 
|-id=305 bgcolor=#d6d6d6
| 473305 ||  || — || October 8, 2004 || Socorro || LINEAR || — || align=right | 3.9 km || 
|-id=306 bgcolor=#fefefe
| 473306 ||  || — || November 19, 2008 || Mount Lemmon || Mount Lemmon Survey || — || align=right data-sort-value="0.89" | 890 m || 
|-id=307 bgcolor=#E9E9E9
| 473307 ||  || — || June 21, 2010 || Mount Lemmon || Mount Lemmon Survey || — || align=right | 2.5 km || 
|-id=308 bgcolor=#d6d6d6
| 473308 ||  || — || November 11, 2010 || Catalina || CSS || — || align=right | 3.6 km || 
|-id=309 bgcolor=#E9E9E9
| 473309 ||  || — || September 20, 2011 || Kitt Peak || Spacewatch || — || align=right | 1.8 km || 
|-id=310 bgcolor=#fefefe
| 473310 ||  || — || September 19, 2001 || Socorro || LINEAR || — || align=right data-sort-value="0.82" | 820 m || 
|-id=311 bgcolor=#fefefe
| 473311 ||  || — || August 12, 2004 || Campo Imperatore || CINEOS || — || align=right data-sort-value="0.90" | 900 m || 
|-id=312 bgcolor=#E9E9E9
| 473312 ||  || — || November 20, 2003 || Kitt Peak || Spacewatch || — || align=right | 1.2 km || 
|-id=313 bgcolor=#d6d6d6
| 473313 ||  || — || October 25, 2005 || Kitt Peak || Spacewatch || EOS || align=right | 1.9 km || 
|-id=314 bgcolor=#E9E9E9
| 473314 ||  || — || September 29, 2011 || Mount Lemmon || Mount Lemmon Survey || — || align=right | 1.3 km || 
|-id=315 bgcolor=#d6d6d6
| 473315 ||  || — || October 7, 2004 || Socorro || LINEAR || HYG || align=right | 3.0 km || 
|-id=316 bgcolor=#E9E9E9
| 473316 ||  || — || August 29, 2006 || Kitt Peak || Spacewatch || EUN || align=right | 1.4 km || 
|-id=317 bgcolor=#E9E9E9
| 473317 ||  || — || November 20, 2008 || Kitt Peak || Spacewatch || — || align=right | 1.4 km || 
|-id=318 bgcolor=#d6d6d6
| 473318 ||  || — || March 9, 2007 || Mount Lemmon || Mount Lemmon Survey || — || align=right | 3.3 km || 
|-id=319 bgcolor=#d6d6d6
| 473319 ||  || — || March 26, 2008 || Mount Lemmon || Mount Lemmon Survey || — || align=right | 2.9 km || 
|-id=320 bgcolor=#d6d6d6
| 473320 ||  || — || April 20, 2007 || Mount Lemmon || Mount Lemmon Survey || — || align=right | 3.0 km || 
|-id=321 bgcolor=#E9E9E9
| 473321 ||  || — || December 28, 2011 || Catalina || CSS || EUN || align=right | 1.5 km || 
|-id=322 bgcolor=#d6d6d6
| 473322 ||  || — || December 2, 2004 || Anderson Mesa || LONEOS || Tj (2.99) || align=right | 3.8 km || 
|-id=323 bgcolor=#E9E9E9
| 473323 ||  || — || February 19, 2009 || Kitt Peak || Spacewatch || — || align=right | 1.7 km || 
|-id=324 bgcolor=#fefefe
| 473324 ||  || — || October 9, 2004 || Kitt Peak || Spacewatch || NYS || align=right data-sort-value="0.76" | 760 m || 
|-id=325 bgcolor=#d6d6d6
| 473325 ||  || — || September 15, 2009 || Kitt Peak || Spacewatch || — || align=right | 3.0 km || 
|-id=326 bgcolor=#d6d6d6
| 473326 ||  || — || September 10, 2010 || Kitt Peak || Spacewatch || — || align=right | 3.0 km || 
|-id=327 bgcolor=#fefefe
| 473327 ||  || — || October 25, 2005 || Anderson Mesa || LONEOS || — || align=right data-sort-value="0.94" | 940 m || 
|-id=328 bgcolor=#E9E9E9
| 473328 ||  || — || February 10, 1999 || Kitt Peak || Spacewatch || GEF || align=right | 1.6 km || 
|-id=329 bgcolor=#d6d6d6
| 473329 ||  || — || February 27, 2006 || Kitt Peak || Spacewatch || — || align=right | 2.8 km || 
|-id=330 bgcolor=#E9E9E9
| 473330 ||  || — || October 2, 2006 || Kitt Peak || Spacewatch || — || align=right | 1.7 km || 
|-id=331 bgcolor=#fefefe
| 473331 ||  || — || August 27, 2005 || Kitt Peak || Spacewatch || — || align=right data-sort-value="0.68" | 680 m || 
|-id=332 bgcolor=#fefefe
| 473332 ||  || — || November 8, 2007 || Mount Lemmon || Mount Lemmon Survey || H || align=right data-sort-value="0.75" | 750 m || 
|-id=333 bgcolor=#fefefe
| 473333 ||  || — || October 4, 2007 || Mount Lemmon || Mount Lemmon Survey || — || align=right data-sort-value="0.90" | 900 m || 
|-id=334 bgcolor=#d6d6d6
| 473334 ||  || — || October 9, 2004 || Kitt Peak || Spacewatch || — || align=right | 3.2 km || 
|-id=335 bgcolor=#E9E9E9
| 473335 ||  || — || December 31, 2007 || Catalina || CSS || — || align=right | 1.1 km || 
|-id=336 bgcolor=#fefefe
| 473336 ||  || — || October 27, 2008 || Mount Lemmon || Mount Lemmon Survey || — || align=right data-sort-value="0.74" | 740 m || 
|-id=337 bgcolor=#fefefe
| 473337 ||  || — || October 27, 2005 || Mount Lemmon || Mount Lemmon Survey || — || align=right data-sort-value="0.74" | 740 m || 
|-id=338 bgcolor=#d6d6d6
| 473338 ||  || — || December 14, 2003 || Kitt Peak || Spacewatch || 7:4 || align=right | 4.7 km || 
|-id=339 bgcolor=#d6d6d6
| 473339 ||  || — || October 8, 2004 || Kitt Peak || Spacewatch || — || align=right | 3.6 km || 
|-id=340 bgcolor=#E9E9E9
| 473340 ||  || — || September 14, 2007 || Kitt Peak || Spacewatch || — || align=right data-sort-value="0.80" | 800 m || 
|-id=341 bgcolor=#E9E9E9
| 473341 ||  || — || September 18, 2001 || Kitt Peak || Spacewatch || — || align=right | 2.2 km || 
|-id=342 bgcolor=#d6d6d6
| 473342 ||  || — || December 22, 2005 || Kitt Peak || Spacewatch || — || align=right | 3.0 km || 
|-id=343 bgcolor=#E9E9E9
| 473343 ||  || — || December 5, 2007 || Mount Lemmon || Mount Lemmon Survey || — || align=right | 3.3 km || 
|-id=344 bgcolor=#d6d6d6
| 473344 ||  || — || May 7, 2008 || Kitt Peak || Spacewatch || — || align=right | 2.8 km || 
|-id=345 bgcolor=#d6d6d6
| 473345 ||  || — || September 10, 2004 || Kitt Peak || Spacewatch || — || align=right | 2.9 km || 
|-id=346 bgcolor=#E9E9E9
| 473346 ||  || — || June 7, 2006 || Siding Spring || SSS || EUN || align=right | 1.6 km || 
|-id=347 bgcolor=#E9E9E9
| 473347 ||  || — || June 18, 2010 || Mount Lemmon || Mount Lemmon Survey || WIT || align=right | 1.3 km || 
|-id=348 bgcolor=#E9E9E9
| 473348 ||  || — || December 31, 2007 || Kitt Peak || Spacewatch || — || align=right | 3.7 km || 
|-id=349 bgcolor=#E9E9E9
| 473349 ||  || — || October 4, 2006 || Mount Lemmon || Mount Lemmon Survey || WIT || align=right data-sort-value="0.93" | 930 m || 
|-id=350 bgcolor=#E9E9E9
| 473350 ||  || — || May 3, 2010 || Kitt Peak || Spacewatch || critical || align=right | 1.6 km || 
|-id=351 bgcolor=#d6d6d6
| 473351 ||  || — || September 26, 2009 || Mount Lemmon || Mount Lemmon Survey || — || align=right | 2.9 km || 
|-id=352 bgcolor=#d6d6d6
| 473352 ||  || — || September 14, 1999 || Kitt Peak || Spacewatch || SHU3:2 || align=right | 5.3 km || 
|-id=353 bgcolor=#d6d6d6
| 473353 ||  || — || December 30, 2005 || Kitt Peak || Spacewatch || — || align=right | 3.4 km || 
|-id=354 bgcolor=#d6d6d6
| 473354 ||  || — || August 8, 2004 || Socorro || LINEAR || — || align=right | 2.9 km || 
|-id=355 bgcolor=#d6d6d6
| 473355 ||  || — || November 8, 2010 || Kitt Peak || Spacewatch || — || align=right | 2.4 km || 
|-id=356 bgcolor=#d6d6d6
| 473356 ||  || — || September 7, 2004 || Kitt Peak || Spacewatch || — || align=right | 2.6 km || 
|-id=357 bgcolor=#d6d6d6
| 473357 ||  || — || March 9, 2008 || Mount Lemmon || Mount Lemmon Survey || — || align=right | 2.5 km || 
|-id=358 bgcolor=#d6d6d6
| 473358 ||  || — || October 1, 2005 || Kitt Peak || Spacewatch || — || align=right | 3.2 km || 
|-id=359 bgcolor=#d6d6d6
| 473359 ||  || — || April 19, 2007 || Kitt Peak || Spacewatch || — || align=right | 2.9 km || 
|-id=360 bgcolor=#d6d6d6
| 473360 ||  || — || October 11, 2004 || Kitt Peak || Spacewatch || — || align=right | 2.4 km || 
|-id=361 bgcolor=#fefefe
| 473361 ||  || — || September 5, 2008 || Kitt Peak || Spacewatch || — || align=right data-sort-value="0.96" | 960 m || 
|-id=362 bgcolor=#E9E9E9
| 473362 ||  || — || August 19, 2006 || Kitt Peak || Spacewatch || — || align=right | 1.5 km || 
|-id=363 bgcolor=#d6d6d6
| 473363 ||  || — || October 29, 1998 || Kitt Peak || Spacewatch || — || align=right | 3.9 km || 
|-id=364 bgcolor=#E9E9E9
| 473364 ||  || — || September 21, 2003 || Kitt Peak || Spacewatch || — || align=right data-sort-value="0.90" | 900 m || 
|-id=365 bgcolor=#fefefe
| 473365 ||  || — || January 1, 2009 || Mount Lemmon || Mount Lemmon Survey || — || align=right data-sort-value="0.91" | 910 m || 
|-id=366 bgcolor=#d6d6d6
| 473366 ||  || — || November 30, 2005 || Kitt Peak || Spacewatch || EOS || align=right | 2.2 km || 
|-id=367 bgcolor=#E9E9E9
| 473367 ||  || — || September 22, 2006 || Catalina || CSS || — || align=right | 2.1 km || 
|-id=368 bgcolor=#E9E9E9
| 473368 ||  || — || March 29, 2009 || Catalina || CSS || — || align=right | 3.3 km || 
|-id=369 bgcolor=#d6d6d6
| 473369 ||  || — || October 9, 2004 || Kitt Peak || Spacewatch || THM || align=right | 1.9 km || 
|-id=370 bgcolor=#d6d6d6
| 473370 ||  || — || March 10, 2007 || Mount Lemmon || Mount Lemmon Survey || — || align=right | 3.2 km || 
|-id=371 bgcolor=#E9E9E9
| 473371 ||  || — || January 12, 2008 || Mount Lemmon || Mount Lemmon Survey || — || align=right | 2.5 km || 
|-id=372 bgcolor=#E9E9E9
| 473372 ||  || — || September 18, 2006 || Kitt Peak || Spacewatch || WIT || align=right | 1.0 km || 
|-id=373 bgcolor=#d6d6d6
| 473373 ||  || — || March 26, 2003 || Kitt Peak || Spacewatch || — || align=right | 3.1 km || 
|-id=374 bgcolor=#d6d6d6
| 473374 ||  || — || March 9, 2007 || Mount Lemmon || Mount Lemmon Survey || EOS || align=right | 1.9 km || 
|-id=375 bgcolor=#d6d6d6
| 473375 ||  || — || November 8, 2010 || Kitt Peak || Spacewatch || — || align=right | 2.9 km || 
|-id=376 bgcolor=#E9E9E9
| 473376 ||  || — || December 15, 2007 || Kitt Peak || Spacewatch || MAR || align=right data-sort-value="0.97" | 970 m || 
|-id=377 bgcolor=#d6d6d6
| 473377 ||  || — || October 29, 1999 || Kitt Peak || Spacewatch || — || align=right | 2.7 km || 
|-id=378 bgcolor=#E9E9E9
| 473378 ||  || — || September 27, 2006 || Catalina || CSS || JUN || align=right | 1.2 km || 
|-id=379 bgcolor=#d6d6d6
| 473379 ||  || — || January 26, 2006 || Kitt Peak || Spacewatch || — || align=right | 3.0 km || 
|-id=380 bgcolor=#d6d6d6
| 473380 ||  || — || November 8, 2010 || Mount Lemmon || Mount Lemmon Survey || EOS || align=right | 2.2 km || 
|-id=381 bgcolor=#d6d6d6
| 473381 ||  || — || November 20, 2001 || Socorro || LINEAR || KOR || align=right | 1.4 km || 
|-id=382 bgcolor=#E9E9E9
| 473382 ||  || — || October 21, 2006 || Mount Lemmon || Mount Lemmon Survey || AGN || align=right | 1.2 km || 
|-id=383 bgcolor=#d6d6d6
| 473383 ||  || — || October 12, 2004 || Kitt Peak || Spacewatch || — || align=right | 2.3 km || 
|-id=384 bgcolor=#E9E9E9
| 473384 ||  || — || October 29, 2006 || Kitt Peak || Spacewatch || — || align=right | 1.8 km || 
|-id=385 bgcolor=#d6d6d6
| 473385 ||  || — || October 3, 2010 || Kitt Peak || Spacewatch || — || align=right | 3.6 km || 
|-id=386 bgcolor=#d6d6d6
| 473386 ||  || — || October 22, 2006 || Mount Lemmon || Mount Lemmon Survey || — || align=right | 3.2 km || 
|-id=387 bgcolor=#d6d6d6
| 473387 ||  || — || October 23, 2004 || Kitt Peak || Spacewatch || — || align=right | 3.4 km || 
|-id=388 bgcolor=#d6d6d6
| 473388 ||  || — || February 27, 2006 || Catalina || CSS || — || align=right | 3.7 km || 
|-id=389 bgcolor=#d6d6d6
| 473389 ||  || — || May 5, 2008 || Kitt Peak || Spacewatch || — || align=right | 3.1 km || 
|-id=390 bgcolor=#d6d6d6
| 473390 ||  || — || January 2, 2011 || Catalina || CSS || — || align=right | 3.7 km || 
|-id=391 bgcolor=#d6d6d6
| 473391 ||  || — || November 4, 2004 || Kitt Peak || Spacewatch || — || align=right | 2.9 km || 
|-id=392 bgcolor=#d6d6d6
| 473392 ||  || — || October 4, 2004 || Kitt Peak || Spacewatch || EOS || align=right | 2.4 km || 
|-id=393 bgcolor=#d6d6d6
| 473393 ||  || — || December 14, 2010 || Mount Lemmon || Mount Lemmon Survey || EOS || align=right | 2.2 km || 
|-id=394 bgcolor=#d6d6d6
| 473394 ||  || — || November 12, 2010 || Mount Lemmon || Mount Lemmon Survey || — || align=right | 2.4 km || 
|-id=395 bgcolor=#d6d6d6
| 473395 ||  || — || September 15, 2004 || Kitt Peak || Spacewatch || — || align=right | 2.8 km || 
|-id=396 bgcolor=#d6d6d6
| 473396 ||  || — || September 17, 2009 || Catalina || CSS || — || align=right | 4.4 km || 
|-id=397 bgcolor=#E9E9E9
| 473397 ||  || — || August 29, 2006 || Kitt Peak || Spacewatch || EUN || align=right | 1.1 km || 
|-id=398 bgcolor=#d6d6d6
| 473398 ||  || — || May 26, 2008 || Kitt Peak || Spacewatch || — || align=right | 3.2 km || 
|-id=399 bgcolor=#fefefe
| 473399 ||  || — || October 27, 2005 || Anderson Mesa || LONEOS || — || align=right data-sort-value="0.76" | 760 m || 
|-id=400 bgcolor=#d6d6d6
| 473400 ||  || — || February 3, 2012 || Mount Lemmon || Mount Lemmon Survey || — || align=right | 3.5 km || 
|}

473401–473500 

|-bgcolor=#fefefe
| 473401 ||  || — || October 8, 2008 || Mount Lemmon || Mount Lemmon Survey || — || align=right data-sort-value="0.81" | 810 m || 
|-id=402 bgcolor=#fefefe
| 473402 ||  || — || September 10, 2007 || Kitt Peak || Spacewatch || — || align=right | 1.1 km || 
|-id=403 bgcolor=#fefefe
| 473403 ||  || — || January 1, 2009 || Mount Lemmon || Mount Lemmon Survey || — || align=right data-sort-value="0.82" | 820 m || 
|-id=404 bgcolor=#d6d6d6
| 473404 ||  || — || January 14, 2011 || Mount Lemmon || Mount Lemmon Survey || — || align=right | 2.7 km || 
|-id=405 bgcolor=#E9E9E9
| 473405 ||  || — || October 13, 2006 || Kitt Peak || Spacewatch || — || align=right | 2.5 km || 
|-id=406 bgcolor=#d6d6d6
| 473406 ||  || — || October 14, 1998 || Kitt Peak || Spacewatch || — || align=right | 3.4 km || 
|-id=407 bgcolor=#fefefe
| 473407 ||  || — || November 4, 2004 || Catalina || CSS || — || align=right | 1.1 km || 
|-id=408 bgcolor=#E9E9E9
| 473408 ||  || — || April 5, 2009 || Kitt Peak || Spacewatch || KON || align=right | 2.7 km || 
|-id=409 bgcolor=#fefefe
| 473409 ||  || — || January 13, 2005 || Kitt Peak || Spacewatch || — || align=right data-sort-value="0.75" | 750 m || 
|-id=410 bgcolor=#d6d6d6
| 473410 ||  || — || September 15, 2009 || Kitt Peak || Spacewatch || — || align=right | 3.2 km || 
|-id=411 bgcolor=#d6d6d6
| 473411 ||  || — || October 6, 2004 || Kitt Peak || Spacewatch || EOS || align=right | 2.1 km || 
|-id=412 bgcolor=#d6d6d6
| 473412 ||  || — || June 5, 2013 || Mount Lemmon || Mount Lemmon Survey || EOS || align=right | 2.3 km || 
|-id=413 bgcolor=#d6d6d6
| 473413 ||  || — || December 8, 1998 || Kitt Peak || Spacewatch || — || align=right | 2.9 km || 
|-id=414 bgcolor=#d6d6d6
| 473414 ||  || — || May 28, 2008 || Mount Lemmon || Mount Lemmon Survey || — || align=right | 3.1 km || 
|-id=415 bgcolor=#E9E9E9
| 473415 ||  || — || March 3, 2009 || Catalina || CSS || — || align=right | 1.3 km || 
|-id=416 bgcolor=#d6d6d6
| 473416 ||  || — || September 22, 2004 || Kitt Peak || Spacewatch || — || align=right | 2.5 km || 
|-id=417 bgcolor=#d6d6d6
| 473417 ||  || — || November 4, 2004 || Kitt Peak || Spacewatch || — || align=right | 3.3 km || 
|-id=418 bgcolor=#E9E9E9
| 473418 ||  || — || November 12, 2007 || Mount Lemmon || Mount Lemmon Survey || ADE || align=right | 1.8 km || 
|-id=419 bgcolor=#E9E9E9
| 473419 ||  || — || May 1, 2009 || Kitt Peak || Spacewatch ||  || align=right | 2.5 km || 
|-id=420 bgcolor=#E9E9E9
| 473420 ||  || — || October 23, 2006 || Mount Lemmon || Mount Lemmon Survey || AEO || align=right data-sort-value="0.97" | 970 m || 
|-id=421 bgcolor=#fefefe
| 473421 ||  || — || October 31, 2008 || Catalina || CSS || — || align=right | 2.9 km || 
|-id=422 bgcolor=#d6d6d6
| 473422 ||  || — || October 9, 2010 || Kitt Peak || Spacewatch || — || align=right | 2.8 km || 
|-id=423 bgcolor=#E9E9E9
| 473423 ||  || — || December 27, 2011 || Mount Lemmon || Mount Lemmon Survey || — || align=right | 1.1 km || 
|-id=424 bgcolor=#E9E9E9
| 473424 ||  || — || August 13, 2010 || Kitt Peak || Spacewatch || — || align=right | 1.5 km || 
|-id=425 bgcolor=#d6d6d6
| 473425 ||  || — || November 15, 2010 || Mount Lemmon || Mount Lemmon Survey || EMA || align=right | 3.1 km || 
|-id=426 bgcolor=#E9E9E9
| 473426 ||  || — || November 15, 2006 || Catalina || CSS || — || align=right | 2.0 km || 
|-id=427 bgcolor=#d6d6d6
| 473427 ||  || — || September 17, 2009 || Catalina || CSS || — || align=right | 3.8 km || 
|-id=428 bgcolor=#d6d6d6
| 473428 ||  || — || July 21, 2010 || WISE || WISE || — || align=right | 2.2 km || 
|-id=429 bgcolor=#d6d6d6
| 473429 ||  || — || January 2, 2006 || Catalina || CSS || — || align=right | 3.3 km || 
|-id=430 bgcolor=#E9E9E9
| 473430 ||  || — || September 25, 2006 || Catalina || CSS || EUN || align=right | 1.1 km || 
|-id=431 bgcolor=#E9E9E9
| 473431 ||  || — || March 19, 2009 || Mount Lemmon || Mount Lemmon Survey || — || align=right | 1.1 km || 
|-id=432 bgcolor=#d6d6d6
| 473432 ||  || — || October 22, 2005 || Kitt Peak || Spacewatch || KOR || align=right | 1.5 km || 
|-id=433 bgcolor=#d6d6d6
| 473433 ||  || — || November 3, 2004 || Anderson Mesa || LONEOS || — || align=right | 2.8 km || 
|-id=434 bgcolor=#d6d6d6
| 473434 ||  || — || December 6, 2005 || Kitt Peak || Spacewatch || EOS || align=right | 2.0 km || 
|-id=435 bgcolor=#fefefe
| 473435 ||  || — || November 6, 2005 || Kitt Peak || Spacewatch || — || align=right data-sort-value="0.69" | 690 m || 
|-id=436 bgcolor=#fefefe
| 473436 ||  || — || January 3, 2009 || Mount Lemmon || Mount Lemmon Survey || — || align=right | 2.0 km || 
|-id=437 bgcolor=#fefefe
| 473437 ||  || — || November 21, 2008 || Kitt Peak || Spacewatch || V || align=right data-sort-value="0.72" | 720 m || 
|-id=438 bgcolor=#E9E9E9
| 473438 ||  || — || October 7, 2010 || Catalina || CSS || GEF || align=right | 1.2 km || 
|-id=439 bgcolor=#E9E9E9
| 473439 ||  || — || April 3, 2000 || Kitt Peak || Spacewatch || — || align=right | 1.1 km || 
|-id=440 bgcolor=#fefefe
| 473440 ||  || — || December 31, 2008 || Kitt Peak || Spacewatch || — || align=right data-sort-value="0.77" | 770 m || 
|-id=441 bgcolor=#fefefe
| 473441 ||  || — || June 24, 2012 || Mount Lemmon || Mount Lemmon Survey || H || align=right data-sort-value="0.79" | 790 m || 
|-id=442 bgcolor=#d6d6d6
| 473442 ||  || — || December 10, 2004 || Kitt Peak || Spacewatch || — || align=right | 3.6 km || 
|-id=443 bgcolor=#E9E9E9
| 473443 ||  || — || May 10, 2010 || WISE || WISE || — || align=right | 2.3 km || 
|-id=444 bgcolor=#fefefe
| 473444 ||  || — || September 14, 2007 || Catalina || CSS || — || align=right | 1.2 km || 
|-id=445 bgcolor=#E9E9E9
| 473445 ||  || — || March 11, 2008 || Siding Spring || SSS || — || align=right | 1.8 km || 
|-id=446 bgcolor=#E9E9E9
| 473446 ||  || — || September 2, 2010 || Mount Lemmon || Mount Lemmon Survey || GEF || align=right | 1.5 km || 
|-id=447 bgcolor=#d6d6d6
| 473447 ||  || — || January 14, 2010 || WISE || WISE || — || align=right | 5.9 km || 
|-id=448 bgcolor=#E9E9E9
| 473448 ||  || — || April 30, 2009 || Kitt Peak || Spacewatch || EUN || align=right data-sort-value="0.95" | 950 m || 
|-id=449 bgcolor=#E9E9E9
| 473449 ||  || — || March 17, 2004 || Kitt Peak || Spacewatch || — || align=right | 1.4 km || 
|-id=450 bgcolor=#d6d6d6
| 473450 ||  || — || January 10, 2011 || Kitt Peak || Spacewatch || — || align=right | 4.4 km || 
|-id=451 bgcolor=#d6d6d6
| 473451 ||  || — || December 6, 2010 || Catalina || CSS || — || align=right | 2.8 km || 
|-id=452 bgcolor=#E9E9E9
| 473452 ||  || — || January 27, 2012 || Mount Lemmon || Mount Lemmon Survey || AGN || align=right | 1.1 km || 
|-id=453 bgcolor=#fefefe
| 473453 ||  || — || December 1, 2005 || Kitt Peak || Spacewatch || V || align=right data-sort-value="0.68" | 680 m || 
|-id=454 bgcolor=#d6d6d6
| 473454 ||  || — || January 31, 2006 || Kitt Peak || Spacewatch || — || align=right | 2.5 km || 
|-id=455 bgcolor=#fefefe
| 473455 ||  || — || February 17, 2001 || Kitt Peak || Spacewatch || — || align=right data-sort-value="0.70" | 700 m || 
|-id=456 bgcolor=#d6d6d6
| 473456 ||  || — || September 24, 2009 || Mount Lemmon || Mount Lemmon Survey || — || align=right | 2.5 km || 
|-id=457 bgcolor=#d6d6d6
| 473457 ||  || — || January 6, 2006 || Socorro || LINEAR || — || align=right | 4.3 km || 
|-id=458 bgcolor=#FA8072
| 473458 ||  || — || January 15, 2008 || Mount Lemmon || Mount Lemmon Survey || — || align=right | 3.5 km || 
|-id=459 bgcolor=#E9E9E9
| 473459 ||  || — || April 30, 2009 || Kitt Peak || Spacewatch || — || align=right | 1.3 km || 
|-id=460 bgcolor=#d6d6d6
| 473460 ||  || — || April 25, 2007 || Mount Lemmon || Mount Lemmon Survey || — || align=right | 2.7 km || 
|-id=461 bgcolor=#d6d6d6
| 473461 ||  || — || May 5, 2008 || Kitt Peak || Spacewatch || — || align=right | 2.2 km || 
|-id=462 bgcolor=#d6d6d6
| 473462 ||  || — || September 30, 2009 || Mount Lemmon || Mount Lemmon Survey || — || align=right | 3.0 km || 
|-id=463 bgcolor=#d6d6d6
| 473463 ||  || — || December 22, 2005 || Kitt Peak || Spacewatch || — || align=right | 3.2 km || 
|-id=464 bgcolor=#d6d6d6
| 473464 ||  || — || September 18, 2009 || Kitt Peak || Spacewatch || — || align=right | 3.3 km || 
|-id=465 bgcolor=#d6d6d6
| 473465 ||  || — || January 16, 2011 || Mount Lemmon || Mount Lemmon Survey || — || align=right | 2.8 km || 
|-id=466 bgcolor=#E9E9E9
| 473466 ||  || — || April 4, 2008 || Kitt Peak || Spacewatch || — || align=right | 2.1 km || 
|-id=467 bgcolor=#fefefe
| 473467 ||  || — || December 19, 2009 || Mount Lemmon || Mount Lemmon Survey || — || align=right data-sort-value="0.81" | 810 m || 
|-id=468 bgcolor=#d6d6d6
| 473468 ||  || — || April 11, 2007 || Kitt Peak || Spacewatch || — || align=right | 2.9 km || 
|-id=469 bgcolor=#E9E9E9
| 473469 ||  || — || September 11, 2010 || Kitt Peak || Spacewatch || AGN || align=right data-sort-value="0.83" | 830 m || 
|-id=470 bgcolor=#E9E9E9
| 473470 ||  || — || December 11, 2006 || Kitt Peak || Spacewatch || — || align=right | 2.0 km || 
|-id=471 bgcolor=#E9E9E9
| 473471 ||  || — || October 19, 2006 || Mount Lemmon || Mount Lemmon Survey || EUN || align=right | 1.3 km || 
|-id=472 bgcolor=#d6d6d6
| 473472 ||  || — || December 11, 2004 || Campo Imperatore || CINEOS || — || align=right | 3.0 km || 
|-id=473 bgcolor=#E9E9E9
| 473473 ||  || — || December 18, 2007 || Mount Lemmon || Mount Lemmon Survey || MAR || align=right data-sort-value="0.99" | 990 m || 
|-id=474 bgcolor=#E9E9E9
| 473474 ||  || — || July 18, 2006 || Siding Spring || SSS || EUN || align=right | 1.8 km || 
|-id=475 bgcolor=#fefefe
| 473475 ||  || — || July 21, 2004 || Siding Spring || SSS || — || align=right | 1.0 km || 
|-id=476 bgcolor=#fefefe
| 473476 ||  || — || May 2, 2003 || Kitt Peak || Spacewatch || — || align=right data-sort-value="0.83" | 830 m || 
|-id=477 bgcolor=#d6d6d6
| 473477 ||  || — || October 27, 1998 || Kitt Peak || Spacewatch || — || align=right | 2.3 km || 
|-id=478 bgcolor=#d6d6d6
| 473478 ||  || — || September 18, 2003 || Kitt Peak || Spacewatch || — || align=right | 3.1 km || 
|-id=479 bgcolor=#fefefe
| 473479 ||  || — || January 15, 2005 || Kitt Peak || Spacewatch || — || align=right data-sort-value="0.86" | 860 m || 
|-id=480 bgcolor=#d6d6d6
| 473480 ||  || — || September 18, 2009 || Kitt Peak || Spacewatch || EOS || align=right | 1.6 km || 
|-id=481 bgcolor=#d6d6d6
| 473481 ||  || — || January 29, 2010 || WISE || WISE || — || align=right | 4.5 km || 
|-id=482 bgcolor=#E9E9E9
| 473482 ||  || — || January 10, 2008 || Kitt Peak || Spacewatch || EUN || align=right data-sort-value="0.86" | 860 m || 
|-id=483 bgcolor=#E9E9E9
| 473483 ||  || — || October 1, 2010 || Mount Lemmon || Mount Lemmon Survey || — || align=right | 2.2 km || 
|-id=484 bgcolor=#d6d6d6
| 473484 ||  || — || April 8, 2006 || Kitt Peak || Spacewatch || — || align=right | 4.6 km || 
|-id=485 bgcolor=#d6d6d6
| 473485 ||  || — || March 2, 2006 || Kitt Peak || Spacewatch || — || align=right | 2.8 km || 
|-id=486 bgcolor=#fefefe
| 473486 ||  || — || April 10, 2005 || Catalina || CSS || — || align=right data-sort-value="0.83" | 830 m || 
|-id=487 bgcolor=#E9E9E9
| 473487 ||  || — || April 13, 2013 || Mount Lemmon || Mount Lemmon Survey || — || align=right | 1.3 km || 
|-id=488 bgcolor=#d6d6d6
| 473488 ||  || — || April 21, 2006 || Kitt Peak || Spacewatch || — || align=right | 2.9 km || 
|-id=489 bgcolor=#fefefe
| 473489 ||  || — || October 31, 2008 || Kitt Peak || Spacewatch || — || align=right data-sort-value="0.71" | 710 m || 
|-id=490 bgcolor=#d6d6d6
| 473490 ||  || — || December 14, 2010 || Mount Lemmon || Mount Lemmon Survey || EOS || align=right | 1.5 km || 
|-id=491 bgcolor=#d6d6d6
| 473491 ||  || — || April 25, 2007 || Kitt Peak || Spacewatch || — || align=right | 2.5 km || 
|-id=492 bgcolor=#d6d6d6
| 473492 ||  || — || November 15, 2010 || Mount Lemmon || Mount Lemmon Survey || — || align=right | 3.5 km || 
|-id=493 bgcolor=#fefefe
| 473493 ||  || — || January 25, 2009 || Kitt Peak || Spacewatch || — || align=right data-sort-value="0.76" | 760 m || 
|-id=494 bgcolor=#E9E9E9
| 473494 ||  || — || December 5, 2007 || Mount Lemmon || Mount Lemmon Survey || — || align=right | 1.1 km || 
|-id=495 bgcolor=#E9E9E9
| 473495 ||  || — || February 9, 2008 || Kitt Peak || Spacewatch || — || align=right | 1.5 km || 
|-id=496 bgcolor=#E9E9E9
| 473496 ||  || — || May 8, 2005 || Mount Lemmon || Mount Lemmon Survey || EUN || align=right | 1.4 km || 
|-id=497 bgcolor=#d6d6d6
| 473497 ||  || — || March 16, 2007 || Kitt Peak || Spacewatch || — || align=right | 2.5 km || 
|-id=498 bgcolor=#d6d6d6
| 473498 ||  || — || October 18, 2003 || Kitt Peak || Spacewatch || critical || align=right | 2.7 km || 
|-id=499 bgcolor=#E9E9E9
| 473499 ||  || — || March 6, 2008 || Mount Lemmon || Mount Lemmon Survey || — || align=right | 1.3 km || 
|-id=500 bgcolor=#d6d6d6
| 473500 ||  || — || October 22, 2009 || Mount Lemmon || Mount Lemmon Survey || — || align=right | 3.0 km || 
|}

473501–473600 

|-bgcolor=#d6d6d6
| 473501 ||  || — || September 15, 2009 || Kitt Peak || Spacewatch || — || align=right | 2.1 km || 
|-id=502 bgcolor=#d6d6d6
| 473502 ||  || — || November 6, 2010 || Kitt Peak || Spacewatch || — || align=right | 2.4 km || 
|-id=503 bgcolor=#fefefe
| 473503 Minoruozima ||  ||  || September 19, 2011 || Mount Lemmon || Mount Lemmon Survey || — || align=right data-sort-value="0.73" | 730 m || 
|-id=504 bgcolor=#d6d6d6
| 473504 ||  || — || October 27, 2005 || Kitt Peak || Spacewatch || KOR || align=right | 1.2 km || 
|-id=505 bgcolor=#E9E9E9
| 473505 ||  || — || September 30, 2010 || Mount Lemmon || Mount Lemmon Survey || — || align=right | 1.6 km || 
|-id=506 bgcolor=#d6d6d6
| 473506 ||  || — || October 24, 2009 || Kitt Peak || Spacewatch || HYG || align=right | 2.9 km || 
|-id=507 bgcolor=#fefefe
| 473507 ||  || — || October 25, 2005 || Mount Lemmon || Mount Lemmon Survey || — || align=right data-sort-value="0.74" | 740 m || 
|-id=508 bgcolor=#E9E9E9
| 473508 ||  || — || December 13, 2006 || Kitt Peak || Spacewatch || — || align=right | 2.1 km || 
|-id=509 bgcolor=#E9E9E9
| 473509 ||  || — || December 14, 2007 || Mount Lemmon || Mount Lemmon Survey || — || align=right | 1.2 km || 
|-id=510 bgcolor=#d6d6d6
| 473510 ||  || — || March 12, 2007 || Mount Lemmon || Mount Lemmon Survey || — || align=right | 2.8 km || 
|-id=511 bgcolor=#fefefe
| 473511 ||  || — || October 10, 2007 || Mount Lemmon || Mount Lemmon Survey || NYS || align=right data-sort-value="0.55" | 550 m || 
|-id=512 bgcolor=#E9E9E9
| 473512 ||  || — || August 29, 2005 || Campo Imperatore || CINEOS || — || align=right | 2.6 km || 
|-id=513 bgcolor=#fefefe
| 473513 ||  || — || December 1, 2008 || Mount Lemmon || Mount Lemmon Survey || — || align=right data-sort-value="0.79" | 790 m || 
|-id=514 bgcolor=#d6d6d6
| 473514 ||  || — || October 23, 2009 || Mount Lemmon || Mount Lemmon Survey || — || align=right | 2.4 km || 
|-id=515 bgcolor=#d6d6d6
| 473515 ||  || — || December 10, 2004 || Kitt Peak || Spacewatch || — || align=right | 3.2 km || 
|-id=516 bgcolor=#d6d6d6
| 473516 ||  || — || December 10, 2010 || Mount Lemmon || Mount Lemmon Survey || — || align=right | 2.5 km || 
|-id=517 bgcolor=#d6d6d6
| 473517 ||  || — || October 8, 2004 || Kitt Peak || Spacewatch || — || align=right | 2.9 km || 
|-id=518 bgcolor=#fefefe
| 473518 ||  || — || December 4, 2005 || Mount Lemmon || Mount Lemmon Survey || — || align=right data-sort-value="0.76" | 760 m || 
|-id=519 bgcolor=#d6d6d6
| 473519 ||  || — || November 4, 2005 || Mount Lemmon || Mount Lemmon Survey || — || align=right | 2.4 km || 
|-id=520 bgcolor=#fefefe
| 473520 ||  || — || December 18, 2001 || Socorro || LINEAR || — || align=right data-sort-value="0.73" | 730 m || 
|-id=521 bgcolor=#fefefe
| 473521 ||  || — || October 8, 2007 || Mount Lemmon || Mount Lemmon Survey || MAS || align=right data-sort-value="0.81" | 810 m || 
|-id=522 bgcolor=#d6d6d6
| 473522 ||  || — || September 27, 2009 || Kitt Peak || Spacewatch || — || align=right | 1.8 km || 
|-id=523 bgcolor=#d6d6d6
| 473523 ||  || — || April 27, 2006 || Kitt Peak || Spacewatch || THM || align=right | 2.2 km || 
|-id=524 bgcolor=#d6d6d6
| 473524 ||  || — || September 17, 2009 || Mount Lemmon || Mount Lemmon Survey || — || align=right | 1.9 km || 
|-id=525 bgcolor=#fefefe
| 473525 ||  || — || September 23, 2011 || Kitt Peak || Spacewatch || V || align=right data-sort-value="0.72" | 720 m || 
|-id=526 bgcolor=#E9E9E9
| 473526 ||  || — || December 19, 2007 || Mount Lemmon || Mount Lemmon Survey || — || align=right | 2.0 km || 
|-id=527 bgcolor=#d6d6d6
| 473527 ||  || — || January 5, 2006 || Socorro || LINEAR || — || align=right | 3.4 km || 
|-id=528 bgcolor=#E9E9E9
| 473528 ||  || — || October 28, 2010 || Catalina || CSS || — || align=right | 2.2 km || 
|-id=529 bgcolor=#d6d6d6
| 473529 ||  || — || September 25, 2009 || Mount Lemmon || Mount Lemmon Survey || — || align=right | 2.6 km || 
|-id=530 bgcolor=#d6d6d6
| 473530 ||  || — || December 10, 2009 || Mount Lemmon || Mount Lemmon Survey || URS || align=right | 4.1 km || 
|-id=531 bgcolor=#E9E9E9
| 473531 ||  || — || October 16, 2006 || Kitt Peak || Spacewatch || — || align=right | 1.8 km || 
|-id=532 bgcolor=#fefefe
| 473532 ||  || — || November 26, 2009 || Kitt Peak || Spacewatch || — || align=right data-sort-value="0.68" | 680 m || 
|-id=533 bgcolor=#d6d6d6
| 473533 ||  || — || April 11, 2007 || Kitt Peak || Spacewatch || — || align=right | 2.8 km || 
|-id=534 bgcolor=#E9E9E9
| 473534 ||  || — || September 4, 2010 || Mount Lemmon || Mount Lemmon Survey || — || align=right | 1.4 km || 
|-id=535 bgcolor=#E9E9E9
| 473535 ||  || — || October 2, 2006 || Mount Lemmon || Mount Lemmon Survey || — || align=right | 1.5 km || 
|-id=536 bgcolor=#d6d6d6
| 473536 ||  || — || November 5, 2010 || Mount Lemmon || Mount Lemmon Survey || — || align=right | 2.9 km || 
|-id=537 bgcolor=#E9E9E9
| 473537 ||  || — || December 31, 1999 || Kitt Peak || Spacewatch || — || align=right | 1.1 km || 
|-id=538 bgcolor=#d6d6d6
| 473538 ||  || — || November 12, 2010 || Mount Lemmon || Mount Lemmon Survey || — || align=right | 2.7 km || 
|-id=539 bgcolor=#E9E9E9
| 473539 ||  || — || November 13, 2006 || Catalina || CSS || EUN || align=right | 1.3 km || 
|-id=540 bgcolor=#d6d6d6
| 473540 ||  || — || March 15, 2007 || Catalina || CSS || — || align=right | 3.5 km || 
|-id=541 bgcolor=#fefefe
| 473541 ||  || — || January 1, 2009 || Kitt Peak || Spacewatch || V || align=right data-sort-value="0.63" | 630 m || 
|-id=542 bgcolor=#E9E9E9
| 473542 ||  || — || January 3, 2000 || Kitt Peak || Spacewatch || — || align=right | 1.1 km || 
|-id=543 bgcolor=#E9E9E9
| 473543 ||  || — || April 6, 2000 || Kitt Peak || Spacewatch || EUN || align=right | 1.2 km || 
|-id=544 bgcolor=#fefefe
| 473544 ||  || — || March 3, 2006 || Kitt Peak || Spacewatch || MAScritical || align=right data-sort-value="0.82" | 820 m || 
|-id=545 bgcolor=#E9E9E9
| 473545 ||  || — || December 16, 2007 || Kitt Peak || Spacewatch || — || align=right data-sort-value="0.90" | 900 m || 
|-id=546 bgcolor=#E9E9E9
| 473546 ||  || — || December 13, 2006 || Kitt Peak || Spacewatch || — || align=right | 2.6 km || 
|-id=547 bgcolor=#fefefe
| 473547 ||  || — || January 14, 2002 || Kitt Peak || Spacewatch || — || align=right data-sort-value="0.49" | 490 m || 
|-id=548 bgcolor=#E9E9E9
| 473548 ||  || — || July 9, 2010 || WISE || WISE || — || align=right | 2.5 km || 
|-id=549 bgcolor=#d6d6d6
| 473549 ||  || — || July 29, 2008 || Mount Lemmon || Mount Lemmon Survey || EOS || align=right | 2.6 km || 
|-id=550 bgcolor=#E9E9E9
| 473550 ||  || — || April 11, 2013 || Mount Lemmon || Mount Lemmon Survey || — || align=right | 2.2 km || 
|-id=551 bgcolor=#E9E9E9
| 473551 ||  || — || December 9, 2006 || Kitt Peak || Spacewatch || — || align=right | 1.8 km || 
|-id=552 bgcolor=#d6d6d6
| 473552 ||  || — || December 25, 2010 || Mount Lemmon || Mount Lemmon Survey || — || align=right | 3.0 km || 
|-id=553 bgcolor=#d6d6d6
| 473553 ||  || — || November 5, 2010 || Kitt Peak || Spacewatch || — || align=right | 3.1 km || 
|-id=554 bgcolor=#d6d6d6
| 473554 ||  || — || January 12, 2002 || Kitt Peak || Spacewatch || KOR || align=right | 1.3 km || 
|-id=555 bgcolor=#E9E9E9
| 473555 ||  || — || October 22, 2006 || Kitt Peak || Spacewatch || — || align=right | 1.8 km || 
|-id=556 bgcolor=#d6d6d6
| 473556 ||  || — || October 17, 2009 || Mount Lemmon || Mount Lemmon Survey || HYG || align=right | 2.0 km || 
|-id=557 bgcolor=#d6d6d6
| 473557 ||  || — || November 17, 1999 || Kitt Peak || Spacewatch || EOS || align=right | 1.7 km || 
|-id=558 bgcolor=#fefefe
| 473558 ||  || — || January 9, 1997 || Kitt Peak || Spacewatch || NYS || align=right data-sort-value="0.66" | 660 m || 
|-id=559 bgcolor=#E9E9E9
| 473559 ||  || — || November 1, 2005 || Mount Lemmon || Mount Lemmon Survey || — || align=right | 2.1 km || 
|-id=560 bgcolor=#fefefe
| 473560 ||  || — || April 15, 1994 || Kitt Peak || Spacewatch || — || align=right data-sort-value="0.72" | 720 m || 
|-id=561 bgcolor=#fefefe
| 473561 ||  || — || March 1, 2009 || Kitt Peak || Spacewatch || — || align=right data-sort-value="0.76" | 760 m || 
|-id=562 bgcolor=#d6d6d6
| 473562 ||  || — || September 30, 2009 || Mount Lemmon || Mount Lemmon Survey ||  || align=right | 3.3 km || 
|-id=563 bgcolor=#E9E9E9
| 473563 ||  || — || November 24, 2006 || Kitt Peak || Spacewatch || — || align=right | 3.4 km || 
|-id=564 bgcolor=#E9E9E9
| 473564 ||  || — || August 27, 2006 || Anderson Mesa || LONEOS || — || align=right | 1.6 km || 
|-id=565 bgcolor=#d6d6d6
| 473565 ||  || — || January 29, 2011 || Kitt Peak || Spacewatch || — || align=right | 2.1 km || 
|-id=566 bgcolor=#d6d6d6
| 473566 ||  || — || January 27, 2010 || WISE || WISE || VER || align=right | 5.0 km || 
|-id=567 bgcolor=#fefefe
| 473567 ||  || — || May 1, 1997 || Kitt Peak || Spacewatch || — || align=right data-sort-value="0.98" | 980 m || 
|-id=568 bgcolor=#E9E9E9
| 473568 ||  || — || October 18, 2006 || Kitt Peak || Spacewatch || — || align=right | 1.9 km || 
|-id=569 bgcolor=#E9E9E9
| 473569 ||  || — || March 8, 2008 || Kitt Peak || Spacewatch || — || align=right | 1.9 km || 
|-id=570 bgcolor=#E9E9E9
| 473570 ||  || — || February 10, 2008 || Kitt Peak || Spacewatch || — || align=right | 1.3 km || 
|-id=571 bgcolor=#fefefe
| 473571 ||  || — || December 29, 2008 || Mount Lemmon || Mount Lemmon Survey || — || align=right | 1.1 km || 
|-id=572 bgcolor=#d6d6d6
| 473572 ||  || — || July 28, 2008 || Mount Lemmon || Mount Lemmon Survey || — || align=right | 3.3 km || 
|-id=573 bgcolor=#d6d6d6
| 473573 ||  || — || May 16, 2007 || Kitt Peak || Spacewatch || — || align=right | 3.0 km || 
|-id=574 bgcolor=#d6d6d6
| 473574 ||  || — || November 1, 2005 || Mount Lemmon || Mount Lemmon Survey || — || align=right | 2.2 km || 
|-id=575 bgcolor=#d6d6d6
| 473575 ||  || — || December 29, 2005 || Mount Lemmon || Mount Lemmon Survey || — || align=right | 2.1 km || 
|-id=576 bgcolor=#E9E9E9
| 473576 ||  || — || November 12, 2006 || Mount Lemmon || Mount Lemmon Survey || — || align=right | 1.3 km || 
|-id=577 bgcolor=#d6d6d6
| 473577 ||  || — || September 20, 2003 || Kitt Peak || Spacewatch || — || align=right | 2.8 km || 
|-id=578 bgcolor=#E9E9E9
| 473578 ||  || — || July 5, 2005 || Siding Spring || SSS || — || align=right | 3.1 km || 
|-id=579 bgcolor=#E9E9E9
| 473579 ||  || — || January 3, 2012 || Mount Lemmon || Mount Lemmon Survey || — || align=right data-sort-value="0.94" | 940 m || 
|-id=580 bgcolor=#d6d6d6
| 473580 ||  || — || November 11, 2010 || Mount Lemmon || Mount Lemmon Survey || KOR || align=right | 1.2 km || 
|-id=581 bgcolor=#fefefe
| 473581 ||  || — || November 30, 2005 || Kitt Peak || Spacewatch || — || align=right data-sort-value="0.62" | 620 m || 
|-id=582 bgcolor=#E9E9E9
| 473582 ||  || — || March 28, 2008 || Mount Lemmon || Mount Lemmon Survey || — || align=right | 2.2 km || 
|-id=583 bgcolor=#d6d6d6
| 473583 ||  || — || November 30, 2005 || Kitt Peak || Spacewatch || — || align=right | 2.4 km || 
|-id=584 bgcolor=#d6d6d6
| 473584 ||  || — || September 21, 2009 || Mount Lemmon || Mount Lemmon Survey || — || align=right | 2.5 km || 
|-id=585 bgcolor=#d6d6d6
| 473585 ||  || — || October 29, 2008 || Mount Lemmon || Mount Lemmon Survey || 7:4 || align=right | 4.9 km || 
|-id=586 bgcolor=#d6d6d6
| 473586 ||  || — || January 23, 2006 || Kitt Peak || Spacewatch || — || align=right | 2.9 km || 
|-id=587 bgcolor=#d6d6d6
| 473587 ||  || — || October 27, 2005 || Kitt Peak || Spacewatch || KOR || align=right | 1.2 km || 
|-id=588 bgcolor=#E9E9E9
| 473588 ||  || — || September 23, 2006 || Kitt Peak || Spacewatch || — || align=right | 1.2 km || 
|-id=589 bgcolor=#d6d6d6
| 473589 ||  || — || November 1, 2005 || Mount Lemmon || Mount Lemmon Survey || KOR || align=right | 1.4 km || 
|-id=590 bgcolor=#d6d6d6
| 473590 ||  || — || January 28, 2007 || Mount Lemmon || Mount Lemmon Survey || KOR || align=right | 1.2 km || 
|-id=591 bgcolor=#d6d6d6
| 473591 ||  || — || December 15, 2009 || Catalina || CSS || — || align=right | 3.8 km || 
|-id=592 bgcolor=#d6d6d6
| 473592 ||  || — || October 18, 2003 || Kitt Peak || Spacewatch || (5651) || align=right | 3.9 km || 
|-id=593 bgcolor=#E9E9E9
| 473593 ||  || — || December 14, 2010 || Mount Lemmon || Mount Lemmon Survey || — || align=right | 2.4 km || 
|-id=594 bgcolor=#d6d6d6
| 473594 ||  || — || November 20, 2003 || Kitt Peak || Spacewatch || — || align=right | 2.4 km || 
|-id=595 bgcolor=#fefefe
| 473595 ||  || — || May 8, 2005 || Mount Lemmon || Mount Lemmon Survey || — || align=right | 1.3 km || 
|-id=596 bgcolor=#E9E9E9
| 473596 ||  || — || February 21, 2012 || Mount Lemmon || Mount Lemmon Survey || EUN || align=right | 1.4 km || 
|-id=597 bgcolor=#d6d6d6
| 473597 ||  || — || May 3, 2013 || Siding Spring || SSS || — || align=right | 3.9 km || 
|-id=598 bgcolor=#E9E9E9
| 473598 ||  || — || September 4, 2010 || Kitt Peak || Spacewatch || — || align=right | 1.7 km || 
|-id=599 bgcolor=#d6d6d6
| 473599 ||  || — || December 14, 2004 || Kitt Peak || Spacewatch || URS || align=right | 5.3 km || 
|-id=600 bgcolor=#d6d6d6
| 473600 ||  || — || November 26, 2005 || Mount Lemmon || Mount Lemmon Survey || KOR || align=right | 1.3 km || 
|}

473601–473700 

|-bgcolor=#E9E9E9
| 473601 ||  || — || December 26, 2011 || Kitt Peak || Spacewatch || — || align=right | 1.2 km || 
|-id=602 bgcolor=#d6d6d6
| 473602 ||  || — || June 5, 2010 || WISE || WISE || 7:4 || align=right | 4.4 km || 
|-id=603 bgcolor=#E9E9E9
| 473603 ||  || — || April 29, 2009 || Kitt Peak || Spacewatch || — || align=right | 2.0 km || 
|-id=604 bgcolor=#d6d6d6
| 473604 ||  || — || August 21, 2003 || Campo Imperatore || CINEOS || — || align=right | 3.2 km || 
|-id=605 bgcolor=#d6d6d6
| 473605 ||  || — || May 28, 2008 || Mount Lemmon || Mount Lemmon Survey || — || align=right | 4.2 km || 
|-id=606 bgcolor=#fefefe
| 473606 ||  || — || November 19, 2008 || Mount Lemmon || Mount Lemmon Survey || — || align=right data-sort-value="0.93" | 930 m || 
|-id=607 bgcolor=#d6d6d6
| 473607 ||  || — || September 19, 2003 || Kitt Peak || Spacewatch || — || align=right | 2.5 km || 
|-id=608 bgcolor=#E9E9E9
| 473608 ||  || — || October 1, 2010 || Mount Lemmon || Mount Lemmon Survey ||  || align=right | 1.7 km || 
|-id=609 bgcolor=#d6d6d6
| 473609 ||  || — || February 21, 2007 || Mount Lemmon || Mount Lemmon Survey || KOR || align=right | 1.3 km || 
|-id=610 bgcolor=#d6d6d6
| 473610 ||  || — || September 29, 2009 || Mount Lemmon || Mount Lemmon Survey || EOS || align=right | 1.9 km || 
|-id=611 bgcolor=#fefefe
| 473611 ||  || — || November 26, 2012 || Mount Lemmon || Mount Lemmon Survey || — || align=right data-sort-value="0.79" | 790 m || 
|-id=612 bgcolor=#d6d6d6
| 473612 ||  || — || May 11, 2007 || Mount Lemmon || Mount Lemmon Survey || — || align=right | 2.6 km || 
|-id=613 bgcolor=#d6d6d6
| 473613 ||  || — || November 16, 2009 || Mount Lemmon || Mount Lemmon Survey || HYG || align=right | 2.9 km || 
|-id=614 bgcolor=#d6d6d6
| 473614 ||  || — || January 31, 2006 || Kitt Peak || Spacewatch || — || align=right | 2.0 km || 
|-id=615 bgcolor=#d6d6d6
| 473615 ||  || — || May 29, 2008 || Mount Lemmon || Mount Lemmon Survey || — || align=right | 3.8 km || 
|-id=616 bgcolor=#d6d6d6
| 473616 ||  || — || June 30, 2008 || Kitt Peak || Spacewatch || — || align=right | 3.6 km || 
|-id=617 bgcolor=#fefefe
| 473617 ||  || — || January 26, 2001 || Kitt Peak || Spacewatch || — || align=right data-sort-value="0.75" | 750 m || 
|-id=618 bgcolor=#d6d6d6
| 473618 ||  || — || September 19, 2009 || Mount Lemmon || Mount Lemmon Survey || THM || align=right | 1.7 km || 
|-id=619 bgcolor=#C2FFFF
| 473619 ||  || — || August 13, 2013 || Kitt Peak || Spacewatch || L5 || align=right | 7.3 km || 
|-id=620 bgcolor=#E9E9E9
| 473620 ||  || — || December 30, 2007 || Kitt Peak || Spacewatch || — || align=right | 1.3 km || 
|-id=621 bgcolor=#d6d6d6
| 473621 ||  || — || October 30, 2005 || Mount Lemmon || Mount Lemmon Survey || — || align=right | 2.8 km || 
|-id=622 bgcolor=#fefefe
| 473622 ||  || — || January 17, 2005 || Kitt Peak || Spacewatch || MAS || align=right data-sort-value="0.58" | 580 m || 
|-id=623 bgcolor=#fefefe
| 473623 ||  || — || October 4, 2004 || Kitt Peak || Spacewatch || — || align=right data-sort-value="0.67" | 670 m || 
|-id=624 bgcolor=#d6d6d6
| 473624 ||  || — || December 26, 2005 || Kitt Peak || Spacewatch || — || align=right | 2.3 km || 
|-id=625 bgcolor=#fefefe
| 473625 ||  || — || January 15, 2005 || Kitt Peak || Spacewatch || — || align=right data-sort-value="0.71" | 710 m || 
|-id=626 bgcolor=#E9E9E9
| 473626 ||  || — || February 7, 2008 || Mount Lemmon || Mount Lemmon Survey || — || align=right | 1.2 km || 
|-id=627 bgcolor=#fefefe
| 473627 ||  || — || December 4, 2008 || Mount Lemmon || Mount Lemmon Survey || — || align=right data-sort-value="0.80" | 800 m || 
|-id=628 bgcolor=#d6d6d6
| 473628 ||  || — || April 2, 2006 || Kitt Peak || Spacewatch || — || align=right | 3.2 km || 
|-id=629 bgcolor=#d6d6d6
| 473629 ||  || — || February 1, 2010 || WISE || WISE || — || align=right | 2.9 km || 
|-id=630 bgcolor=#d6d6d6
| 473630 ||  || — || October 15, 2004 || Mount Lemmon || Mount Lemmon Survey || — || align=right | 2.9 km || 
|-id=631 bgcolor=#d6d6d6
| 473631 ||  || — || October 11, 2010 || Kitt Peak || Spacewatch || — || align=right | 3.5 km || 
|-id=632 bgcolor=#d6d6d6
| 473632 ||  || — || October 14, 2009 || Mount Lemmon || Mount Lemmon Survey || — || align=right | 2.8 km || 
|-id=633 bgcolor=#d6d6d6
| 473633 ||  || — || November 25, 2005 || Kitt Peak || Spacewatch || — || align=right | 2.7 km || 
|-id=634 bgcolor=#E9E9E9
| 473634 ||  || — || June 22, 2006 || Kitt Peak || Spacewatch || — || align=right | 1.2 km || 
|-id=635 bgcolor=#E9E9E9
| 473635 ||  || — || May 19, 2004 || Kitt Peak || Spacewatch || — || align=right | 2.7 km || 
|-id=636 bgcolor=#d6d6d6
| 473636 ||  || — || December 15, 2004 || Kitt Peak || Spacewatch || — || align=right | 3.5 km || 
|-id=637 bgcolor=#fefefe
| 473637 ||  || — || September 21, 2011 || Catalina || CSS || — || align=right data-sort-value="0.85" | 850 m || 
|-id=638 bgcolor=#E9E9E9
| 473638 ||  || — || August 5, 2010 || WISE || WISE || — || align=right | 2.1 km || 
|-id=639 bgcolor=#fefefe
| 473639 ||  || — || January 25, 2009 || Kitt Peak || Spacewatch || MAS || align=right data-sort-value="0.65" | 650 m || 
|-id=640 bgcolor=#E9E9E9
| 473640 ||  || — || December 30, 2007 || Kitt Peak || Spacewatch || (5) || align=right data-sort-value="0.86" | 860 m || 
|-id=641 bgcolor=#E9E9E9
| 473641 ||  || — || November 12, 2006 || Mount Lemmon || Mount Lemmon Survey || WIT || align=right | 1.1 km || 
|-id=642 bgcolor=#E9E9E9
| 473642 ||  || — || October 17, 2010 || Mount Lemmon || Mount Lemmon Survey || HOF || align=right | 2.2 km || 
|-id=643 bgcolor=#d6d6d6
| 473643 ||  || — || December 6, 2010 || Mount Lemmon || Mount Lemmon Survey || — || align=right | 4.3 km || 
|-id=644 bgcolor=#d6d6d6
| 473644 ||  || — || January 30, 2006 || Kitt Peak || Spacewatch || — || align=right | 1.9 km || 
|-id=645 bgcolor=#E9E9E9
| 473645 ||  || — || October 18, 2006 || Kitt Peak || Spacewatch || — || align=right | 2.0 km || 
|-id=646 bgcolor=#E9E9E9
| 473646 ||  || — || March 2, 2009 || Kitt Peak || Spacewatch || — || align=right | 2.6 km || 
|-id=647 bgcolor=#d6d6d6
| 473647 ||  || — || September 19, 2009 || Kitt Peak || Spacewatch || — || align=right | 2.3 km || 
|-id=648 bgcolor=#d6d6d6
| 473648 ||  || — || August 26, 2009 || Catalina || CSS || KOR || align=right | 1.7 km || 
|-id=649 bgcolor=#d6d6d6
| 473649 ||  || — || September 25, 2009 || Mount Lemmon || Mount Lemmon Survey || — || align=right | 2.4 km || 
|-id=650 bgcolor=#d6d6d6
| 473650 ||  || — || December 7, 2005 || Kitt Peak || Spacewatch || — || align=right | 2.9 km || 
|-id=651 bgcolor=#E9E9E9
| 473651 ||  || — || January 8, 2000 || Kitt Peak || Spacewatch || — || align=right data-sort-value="0.86" | 860 m || 
|-id=652 bgcolor=#d6d6d6
| 473652 ||  || — || October 28, 2005 || Mount Lemmon || Mount Lemmon Survey || — || align=right | 3.0 km || 
|-id=653 bgcolor=#d6d6d6
| 473653 ||  || — || October 4, 2003 || Kitt Peak || Spacewatch || — || align=right | 3.0 km || 
|-id=654 bgcolor=#fefefe
| 473654 ||  || — || October 23, 2004 || Kitt Peak || Spacewatch || — || align=right data-sort-value="0.99" | 990 m || 
|-id=655 bgcolor=#fefefe
| 473655 ||  || — || September 7, 2004 || Kitt Peak || Spacewatch || — || align=right data-sort-value="0.67" | 670 m || 
|-id=656 bgcolor=#d6d6d6
| 473656 ||  || — || November 1, 2005 || Mount Lemmon || Mount Lemmon Survey || — || align=right | 2.6 km || 
|-id=657 bgcolor=#E9E9E9
| 473657 ||  || — || October 22, 2006 || Kitt Peak || Spacewatch || — || align=right | 1.2 km || 
|-id=658 bgcolor=#E9E9E9
| 473658 ||  || — || December 14, 2006 || Mount Lemmon || Mount Lemmon Survey || — || align=right | 2.0 km || 
|-id=659 bgcolor=#d6d6d6
| 473659 ||  || — || November 21, 2004 || Campo Imperatore || CINEOS || EOS || align=right | 2.0 km || 
|-id=660 bgcolor=#d6d6d6
| 473660 ||  || — || October 23, 2009 || Mount Lemmon || Mount Lemmon Survey || — || align=right | 2.8 km || 
|-id=661 bgcolor=#fefefe
| 473661 ||  || — || October 3, 2008 || Mount Lemmon || Mount Lemmon Survey || — || align=right data-sort-value="0.65" | 650 m || 
|-id=662 bgcolor=#fefefe
| 473662 ||  || — || July 30, 2000 || Socorro || LINEAR || — || align=right data-sort-value="0.91" | 910 m || 
|-id=663 bgcolor=#E9E9E9
| 473663 ||  || — || February 2, 2008 || Catalina || CSS || — || align=right | 2.0 km || 
|-id=664 bgcolor=#d6d6d6
| 473664 ||  || — || January 31, 2006 || Kitt Peak || Spacewatch || — || align=right | 2.0 km || 
|-id=665 bgcolor=#d6d6d6
| 473665 ||  || — || November 1, 2005 || Mount Lemmon || Mount Lemmon Survey || KOR || align=right | 1.2 km || 
|-id=666 bgcolor=#fefefe
| 473666 ||  || — || January 17, 2009 || Kitt Peak || Spacewatch || NYS || align=right data-sort-value="0.58" | 580 m || 
|-id=667 bgcolor=#d6d6d6
| 473667 ||  || — || January 26, 2010 || WISE || WISE || — || align=right | 3.3 km || 
|-id=668 bgcolor=#d6d6d6
| 473668 ||  || — || December 6, 2010 || Kitt Peak || Spacewatch || EOS || align=right | 2.2 km || 
|-id=669 bgcolor=#fefefe
| 473669 ||  || — || September 27, 2011 || Kitt Peak || Spacewatch || — || align=right data-sort-value="0.86" | 860 m || 
|-id=670 bgcolor=#d6d6d6
| 473670 ||  || — || April 15, 2007 || Catalina || CSS || EOS || align=right | 2.6 km || 
|-id=671 bgcolor=#fefefe
| 473671 ||  || — || November 30, 2008 || Kitt Peak || Spacewatch || — || align=right data-sort-value="0.86" | 860 m || 
|-id=672 bgcolor=#d6d6d6
| 473672 ||  || — || December 26, 2005 || Mount Lemmon || Mount Lemmon Survey || — || align=right | 1.9 km || 
|-id=673 bgcolor=#d6d6d6
| 473673 ||  || — || December 3, 2004 || Kitt Peak || Spacewatch || — || align=right | 3.4 km || 
|-id=674 bgcolor=#d6d6d6
| 473674 ||  || — || November 30, 2005 || Mount Lemmon || Mount Lemmon Survey || — || align=right | 2.8 km || 
|-id=675 bgcolor=#E9E9E9
| 473675 ||  || — || October 28, 1994 || Kitt Peak || Spacewatch || — || align=right data-sort-value="0.98" | 980 m || 
|-id=676 bgcolor=#E9E9E9
| 473676 ||  || — || December 28, 2011 || Kitt Peak || Spacewatch || — || align=right | 2.3 km || 
|-id=677 bgcolor=#d6d6d6
| 473677 ||  || — || November 28, 1999 || Kitt Peak || Spacewatch || EOS || align=right | 1.7 km || 
|-id=678 bgcolor=#d6d6d6
| 473678 ||  || — || December 29, 2005 || Kitt Peak || Spacewatch || EOS || align=right | 1.5 km || 
|-id=679 bgcolor=#d6d6d6
| 473679 ||  || — || November 29, 2005 || Kitt Peak || Spacewatch || — || align=right | 1.9 km || 
|-id=680 bgcolor=#E9E9E9
| 473680 ||  || — || September 11, 2010 || Mount Lemmon || Mount Lemmon Survey || — || align=right | 1.3 km || 
|-id=681 bgcolor=#d6d6d6
| 473681 ||  || — || October 31, 2010 || Mount Lemmon || Mount Lemmon Survey || — || align=right | 2.5 km || 
|-id=682 bgcolor=#d6d6d6
| 473682 ||  || — || October 13, 2010 || Kitt Peak || Spacewatch || EOS || align=right | 2.3 km || 
|-id=683 bgcolor=#E9E9E9
| 473683 ||  || — || November 12, 2007 || Mount Lemmon || Mount Lemmon Survey || (5) || align=right data-sort-value="0.93" | 930 m || 
|-id=684 bgcolor=#C2FFFF
| 473684 ||  || — || April 4, 2008 || Kitt Peak || Spacewatch || L5 || align=right | 8.7 km || 
|-id=685 bgcolor=#d6d6d6
| 473685 ||  || — || February 15, 2010 || WISE || WISE || — || align=right | 4.4 km || 
|-id=686 bgcolor=#d6d6d6
| 473686 ||  || — || January 10, 2011 || Mount Lemmon || Mount Lemmon Survey || VER || align=right | 2.9 km || 
|-id=687 bgcolor=#E9E9E9
| 473687 ||  || — || September 2, 2010 || Mount Lemmon || Mount Lemmon Survey || — || align=right | 1.5 km || 
|-id=688 bgcolor=#d6d6d6
| 473688 ||  || — || July 29, 2008 || Kitt Peak || Spacewatch || — || align=right | 3.9 km || 
|-id=689 bgcolor=#fefefe
| 473689 ||  || — || November 11, 2007 || Mount Lemmon || Mount Lemmon Survey || H || align=right data-sort-value="0.67" | 670 m || 
|-id=690 bgcolor=#d6d6d6
| 473690 ||  || — || May 9, 2007 || Mount Lemmon || Mount Lemmon Survey || — || align=right | 3.5 km || 
|-id=691 bgcolor=#d6d6d6
| 473691 ||  || — || September 27, 2008 || Mount Lemmon || Mount Lemmon Survey || — || align=right | 4.1 km || 
|-id=692 bgcolor=#d6d6d6
| 473692 ||  || — || October 15, 2009 || Catalina || CSS || — || align=right | 3.4 km || 
|-id=693 bgcolor=#E9E9E9
| 473693 ||  || — || March 18, 2001 || Kitt Peak || Spacewatch || EUN || align=right | 1.9 km || 
|-id=694 bgcolor=#fefefe
| 473694 ||  || — || September 30, 2005 || Mount Lemmon || Mount Lemmon Survey || — || align=right data-sort-value="0.52" | 520 m || 
|-id=695 bgcolor=#fefefe
| 473695 ||  || — || December 14, 2004 || Socorro || LINEAR || — || align=right | 1.1 km || 
|-id=696 bgcolor=#fefefe
| 473696 ||  || — || September 27, 2011 || Mount Lemmon || Mount Lemmon Survey || — || align=right data-sort-value="0.99" | 990 m || 
|-id=697 bgcolor=#fefefe
| 473697 ||  || — || February 9, 1997 || Kitt Peak || Spacewatch || — || align=right | 1.2 km || 
|-id=698 bgcolor=#d6d6d6
| 473698 ||  || — || December 2, 2004 || Catalina || CSS || — || align=right | 4.5 km || 
|-id=699 bgcolor=#E9E9E9
| 473699 ||  || — || September 19, 2006 || Kitt Peak || Spacewatch || — || align=right | 1.1 km || 
|-id=700 bgcolor=#d6d6d6
| 473700 ||  || — || December 11, 2004 || Kitt Peak || Spacewatch || — || align=right | 4.0 km || 
|}

473701–473800 

|-bgcolor=#d6d6d6
| 473701 ||  || — || February 16, 2010 || WISE || WISE || — || align=right | 5.4 km || 
|-id=702 bgcolor=#fefefe
| 473702 ||  || — || December 14, 2001 || Socorro || LINEAR || — || align=right data-sort-value="0.64" | 640 m || 
|-id=703 bgcolor=#d6d6d6
| 473703 ||  || — || November 24, 2003 || Kitt Peak || Spacewatch || — || align=right | 3.5 km || 
|-id=704 bgcolor=#d6d6d6
| 473704 ||  || — || March 26, 2010 || WISE || WISE || — || align=right | 2.7 km || 
|-id=705 bgcolor=#d6d6d6
| 473705 ||  || — || December 3, 2004 || Kitt Peak || Spacewatch || — || align=right | 2.9 km || 
|-id=706 bgcolor=#E9E9E9
| 473706 ||  || — || December 13, 2006 || Kitt Peak || Spacewatch || — || align=right | 2.1 km || 
|-id=707 bgcolor=#E9E9E9
| 473707 ||  || — || November 19, 2007 || Mount Lemmon || Mount Lemmon Survey || MAR || align=right | 1.2 km || 
|-id=708 bgcolor=#d6d6d6
| 473708 ||  || — || September 22, 2009 || Catalina || CSS || NAE || align=right | 2.9 km || 
|-id=709 bgcolor=#fefefe
| 473709 ||  || — || March 3, 2005 || Catalina || CSS || — || align=right data-sort-value="0.95" | 950 m || 
|-id=710 bgcolor=#d6d6d6
| 473710 ||  || — || March 10, 2010 || WISE || WISE || — || align=right | 4.0 km || 
|-id=711 bgcolor=#E9E9E9
| 473711 ||  || — || July 9, 2010 || WISE || WISE || — || align=right | 2.9 km || 
|-id=712 bgcolor=#E9E9E9
| 473712 ||  || — || February 13, 2012 || Kitt Peak || Spacewatch || — || align=right | 1.4 km || 
|-id=713 bgcolor=#fefefe
| 473713 ||  || — || September 24, 2008 || Mount Lemmon || Mount Lemmon Survey || — || align=right data-sort-value="0.54" | 540 m || 
|-id=714 bgcolor=#d6d6d6
| 473714 ||  || — || September 20, 2003 || Kitt Peak || Spacewatch || — || align=right | 3.5 km || 
|-id=715 bgcolor=#fefefe
| 473715 ||  || — || October 25, 2011 || XuYi || PMO NEO || — || align=right data-sort-value="0.93" | 930 m || 
|-id=716 bgcolor=#E9E9E9
| 473716 ||  || — || December 13, 2006 || Mount Lemmon || Mount Lemmon Survey || — || align=right | 2.6 km || 
|-id=717 bgcolor=#fefefe
| 473717 ||  || — || January 13, 2005 || Kitt Peak || Spacewatch || (5026) || align=right data-sort-value="0.78" | 780 m || 
|-id=718 bgcolor=#C2FFFF
| 473718 ||  || — || April 26, 2010 || WISE || WISE || L5 || align=right | 11 km || 
|-id=719 bgcolor=#E9E9E9
| 473719 ||  || — || December 5, 2003 || Socorro || LINEAR || — || align=right | 2.4 km || 
|-id=720 bgcolor=#d6d6d6
| 473720 ||  || — || May 26, 2007 || Mount Lemmon || Mount Lemmon Survey || — || align=right | 4.1 km || 
|-id=721 bgcolor=#fefefe
| 473721 ||  || — || October 10, 2007 || Mount Lemmon || Mount Lemmon Survey || MAS || align=right data-sort-value="0.54" | 540 m || 
|-id=722 bgcolor=#fefefe
| 473722 ||  || — || January 25, 2009 || Kitt Peak || Spacewatch || — || align=right data-sort-value="0.79" | 790 m || 
|-id=723 bgcolor=#fefefe
| 473723 ||  || — || December 30, 2008 || Mount Lemmon || Mount Lemmon Survey || V || align=right data-sort-value="0.62" | 620 m || 
|-id=724 bgcolor=#E9E9E9
| 473724 ||  || — || October 1, 2005 || Mount Lemmon || Mount Lemmon Survey || — || align=right | 1.8 km || 
|-id=725 bgcolor=#d6d6d6
| 473725 ||  || — || December 18, 2009 || Kitt Peak || Spacewatch || — || align=right | 3.0 km || 
|-id=726 bgcolor=#fefefe
| 473726 ||  || — || June 19, 2010 || Mount Lemmon || Mount Lemmon Survey || — || align=right data-sort-value="0.94" | 940 m || 
|-id=727 bgcolor=#d6d6d6
| 473727 ||  || — || March 3, 2005 || Catalina || CSS || — || align=right | 2.7 km || 
|-id=728 bgcolor=#fefefe
| 473728 ||  || — || October 14, 2007 || Mount Lemmon || Mount Lemmon Survey || V || align=right data-sort-value="0.73" | 730 m || 
|-id=729 bgcolor=#fefefe
| 473729 ||  || — || May 8, 2005 || Kitt Peak || Spacewatch || — || align=right data-sort-value="0.75" | 750 m || 
|-id=730 bgcolor=#fefefe
| 473730 ||  || — || January 9, 2006 || Kitt Peak || Spacewatch || — || align=right data-sort-value="0.60" | 600 m || 
|-id=731 bgcolor=#E9E9E9
| 473731 ||  || — || November 22, 2014 || Mount Lemmon || Mount Lemmon Survey || — || align=right | 1.2 km || 
|-id=732 bgcolor=#d6d6d6
| 473732 ||  || — || February 9, 2005 || Mount Lemmon || Mount Lemmon Survey || — || align=right | 3.0 km || 
|-id=733 bgcolor=#fefefe
| 473733 ||  || — || February 19, 2001 || Socorro || LINEAR || NYS || align=right data-sort-value="0.82" | 820 m || 
|-id=734 bgcolor=#fefefe
| 473734 ||  || — || December 30, 2007 || Kitt Peak || Spacewatch || — || align=right data-sort-value="0.97" | 970 m || 
|-id=735 bgcolor=#fefefe
| 473735 ||  || — || November 27, 2011 || Kitt Peak || Spacewatch || — || align=right data-sort-value="0.78" | 780 m || 
|-id=736 bgcolor=#E9E9E9
| 473736 ||  || — || October 27, 2009 || Kitt Peak || Spacewatch || — || align=right | 1.7 km || 
|-id=737 bgcolor=#d6d6d6
| 473737 ||  || — || March 11, 2005 || Mount Lemmon || Mount Lemmon Survey || — || align=right | 3.0 km || 
|-id=738 bgcolor=#d6d6d6
| 473738 ||  || — || May 31, 2006 || Kitt Peak || Spacewatch || — || align=right | 3.1 km || 
|-id=739 bgcolor=#d6d6d6
| 473739 ||  || — || March 23, 2006 || Catalina || CSS || EOS || align=right | 2.8 km || 
|-id=740 bgcolor=#d6d6d6
| 473740 ||  || — || March 4, 2005 || Catalina || CSS || Tj (2.97) || align=right | 4.4 km || 
|-id=741 bgcolor=#E9E9E9
| 473741 ||  || — || July 29, 2008 || Mount Lemmon || Mount Lemmon Survey || — || align=right | 2.1 km || 
|-id=742 bgcolor=#E9E9E9
| 473742 ||  || — || November 27, 2010 || Mount Lemmon || Mount Lemmon Survey || (5) || align=right data-sort-value="0.71" | 710 m || 
|-id=743 bgcolor=#fefefe
| 473743 ||  || — || April 13, 2005 || Kitt Peak || Spacewatch || — || align=right data-sort-value="0.82" | 820 m || 
|-id=744 bgcolor=#fefefe
| 473744 ||  || — || January 16, 2004 || Kitt Peak || Spacewatch || NYS || align=right data-sort-value="0.71" | 710 m || 
|-id=745 bgcolor=#E9E9E9
| 473745 ||  || — || October 22, 2006 || Mount Lemmon || Mount Lemmon Survey || — || align=right | 2.2 km || 
|-id=746 bgcolor=#E9E9E9
| 473746 ||  || — || February 21, 2007 || Kitt Peak || Spacewatch || — || align=right | 2.1 km || 
|-id=747 bgcolor=#E9E9E9
| 473747 ||  || — || December 9, 2010 || Mount Lemmon || Mount Lemmon Survey || — || align=right | 1.6 km || 
|-id=748 bgcolor=#d6d6d6
| 473748 ||  || — || September 27, 2009 || Kitt Peak || Spacewatch || — || align=right | 3.6 km || 
|-id=749 bgcolor=#d6d6d6
| 473749 ||  || — || March 17, 2005 || Catalina || CSS || THB || align=right | 3.7 km || 
|-id=750 bgcolor=#d6d6d6
| 473750 ||  || — || April 30, 2010 || WISE || WISE || — || align=right | 3.5 km || 
|-id=751 bgcolor=#d6d6d6
| 473751 ||  || — || November 9, 2008 || Mount Lemmon || Mount Lemmon Survey || — || align=right | 3.7 km || 
|-id=752 bgcolor=#d6d6d6
| 473752 ||  || — || January 8, 2010 || Catalina || CSS || — || align=right | 4.8 km || 
|-id=753 bgcolor=#E9E9E9
| 473753 ||  || — || July 12, 2013 || Siding Spring || SSS || — || align=right | 1.7 km || 
|-id=754 bgcolor=#d6d6d6
| 473754 ||  || — || January 16, 2005 || Kitt Peak || Spacewatch || — || align=right | 4.7 km || 
|-id=755 bgcolor=#E9E9E9
| 473755 ||  || — || November 7, 2010 || Catalina || CSS || — || align=right | 1.4 km || 
|-id=756 bgcolor=#E9E9E9
| 473756 ||  || — || March 29, 2012 || Mount Lemmon || Mount Lemmon Survey || — || align=right | 1.2 km || 
|-id=757 bgcolor=#E9E9E9
| 473757 ||  || — || September 22, 2009 || Kitt Peak || Spacewatch || MAR || align=right data-sort-value="0.98" | 980 m || 
|-id=758 bgcolor=#E9E9E9
| 473758 ||  || — || March 15, 2007 || Catalina || CSS || JUN || align=right data-sort-value="0.99" | 990 m || 
|-id=759 bgcolor=#d6d6d6
| 473759 ||  || — || September 23, 2008 || Mount Lemmon || Mount Lemmon Survey || — || align=right | 3.2 km || 
|-id=760 bgcolor=#E9E9E9
| 473760 ||  || — || December 25, 2005 || Kitt Peak || Spacewatch || — || align=right | 2.4 km || 
|-id=761 bgcolor=#E9E9E9
| 473761 ||  || — || November 29, 2005 || Catalina || CSS || — || align=right | 2.4 km || 
|-id=762 bgcolor=#d6d6d6
| 473762 ||  || — || October 14, 2007 || Kitt Peak || Spacewatch || VER || align=right | 3.1 km || 
|-id=763 bgcolor=#E9E9E9
| 473763 ||  || — || February 26, 2007 || Mount Lemmon || Mount Lemmon Survey || — || align=right | 1.9 km || 
|-id=764 bgcolor=#d6d6d6
| 473764 ||  || — || February 19, 2010 || Mount Lemmon || Mount Lemmon Survey || EOS || align=right | 1.9 km || 
|-id=765 bgcolor=#fefefe
| 473765 ||  || — || April 4, 2005 || Mount Lemmon || Mount Lemmon Survey || MAS || align=right data-sort-value="0.82" | 820 m || 
|-id=766 bgcolor=#E9E9E9
| 473766 ||  || — || December 13, 2010 || Mount Lemmon || Mount Lemmon Survey || — || align=right | 2.0 km || 
|-id=767 bgcolor=#fefefe
| 473767 ||  || — || September 20, 2001 || Socorro || LINEAR || — || align=right data-sort-value="0.64" | 640 m || 
|-id=768 bgcolor=#E9E9E9
| 473768 ||  || — || February 28, 2008 || Kitt Peak || Spacewatch || — || align=right data-sort-value="0.89" | 890 m || 
|-id=769 bgcolor=#d6d6d6
| 473769 ||  || — || March 18, 2010 || Mount Lemmon || Mount Lemmon Survey || VER || align=right | 2.3 km || 
|-id=770 bgcolor=#d6d6d6
| 473770 ||  || — || October 18, 2007 || Kitt Peak || Spacewatch || — || align=right | 3.1 km || 
|-id=771 bgcolor=#d6d6d6
| 473771 ||  || — || May 8, 2010 || WISE || WISE || — || align=right | 2.9 km || 
|-id=772 bgcolor=#d6d6d6
| 473772 ||  || — || April 14, 2005 || Kitt Peak || Spacewatch || — || align=right | 3.2 km || 
|-id=773 bgcolor=#fefefe
| 473773 ||  || — || October 21, 2006 || Mount Lemmon || Mount Lemmon Survey || — || align=right data-sort-value="0.84" | 840 m || 
|-id=774 bgcolor=#fefefe
| 473774 ||  || — || April 20, 2006 || Kitt Peak || Spacewatch || (1338) || align=right data-sort-value="0.59" | 590 m || 
|-id=775 bgcolor=#d6d6d6
| 473775 ||  || — || February 21, 2006 || Mount Lemmon || Mount Lemmon Survey || — || align=right | 2.1 km || 
|-id=776 bgcolor=#d6d6d6
| 473776 ||  || — || April 2, 2005 || Siding Spring || SSS || THB || align=right | 2.6 km || 
|-id=777 bgcolor=#E9E9E9
| 473777 ||  || — || September 21, 2009 || Mount Lemmon || Mount Lemmon Survey || — || align=right | 2.2 km || 
|-id=778 bgcolor=#E9E9E9
| 473778 ||  || — || March 27, 2003 || Anderson Mesa || LONEOS || — || align=right | 2.1 km || 
|-id=779 bgcolor=#E9E9E9
| 473779 ||  || — || April 6, 2008 || Mount Lemmon || Mount Lemmon Survey || — || align=right | 1.1 km || 
|-id=780 bgcolor=#d6d6d6
| 473780 ||  || — || November 17, 2009 || Mount Lemmon || Mount Lemmon Survey || — || align=right | 2.6 km || 
|-id=781 bgcolor=#d6d6d6
| 473781 ||  || — || March 27, 2011 || Mount Lemmon || Mount Lemmon Survey || — || align=right | 2.9 km || 
|-id=782 bgcolor=#d6d6d6
| 473782 ||  || — || February 5, 2011 || Mount Lemmon || Mount Lemmon Survey || EOS || align=right | 2.2 km || 
|-id=783 bgcolor=#d6d6d6
| 473783 ||  || — || February 5, 2011 || Mount Lemmon || Mount Lemmon Survey || EOS || align=right | 2.2 km || 
|-id=784 bgcolor=#fefefe
| 473784 ||  || — || October 11, 2007 || Catalina || CSS || — || align=right data-sort-value="0.85" | 850 m || 
|-id=785 bgcolor=#FA8072
| 473785 ||  || — || September 17, 2004 || Socorro || LINEAR || H || align=right data-sort-value="0.77" | 770 m || 
|-id=786 bgcolor=#fefefe
| 473786 ||  || — || April 10, 2005 || Kitt Peak || Spacewatch || — || align=right data-sort-value="0.77" | 770 m || 
|-id=787 bgcolor=#d6d6d6
| 473787 ||  || — || September 23, 2008 || Mount Lemmon || Mount Lemmon Survey || — || align=right | 3.2 km || 
|-id=788 bgcolor=#fefefe
| 473788 ||  || — || December 2, 2010 || Mount Lemmon || Mount Lemmon Survey || — || align=right data-sort-value="0.80" | 800 m || 
|-id=789 bgcolor=#d6d6d6
| 473789 ||  || — || March 17, 2010 || Kitt Peak || Spacewatch || — || align=right | 3.0 km || 
|-id=790 bgcolor=#fefefe
| 473790 ||  || — || November 8, 2007 || Mount Lemmon || Mount Lemmon Survey || — || align=right data-sort-value="0.83" | 830 m || 
|-id=791 bgcolor=#d6d6d6
| 473791 ||  || — || June 22, 2010 || WISE || WISE || — || align=right | 3.5 km || 
|-id=792 bgcolor=#E9E9E9
| 473792 ||  || — || September 30, 2005 || Mount Lemmon || Mount Lemmon Survey || — || align=right | 1.7 km || 
|-id=793 bgcolor=#E9E9E9
| 473793 ||  || — || March 5, 2002 || Kitt Peak || Spacewatch || — || align=right | 1.8 km || 
|-id=794 bgcolor=#fefefe
| 473794 ||  || — || September 15, 2010 || Kitt Peak || Spacewatch || — || align=right data-sort-value="0.80" | 800 m || 
|-id=795 bgcolor=#d6d6d6
| 473795 ||  || — || September 10, 2007 || Mount Lemmon || Mount Lemmon Survey || — || align=right | 3.2 km || 
|-id=796 bgcolor=#E9E9E9
| 473796 ||  || — || December 21, 2006 || Kitt Peak || Spacewatch || KON || align=right | 2.8 km || 
|-id=797 bgcolor=#d6d6d6
| 473797 ||  || — || May 2, 2005 || Kitt Peak || Spacewatch || — || align=right | 4.8 km || 
|-id=798 bgcolor=#E9E9E9
| 473798 ||  || — || August 27, 2009 || Kitt Peak || Spacewatch || — || align=right | 2.1 km || 
|-id=799 bgcolor=#d6d6d6
| 473799 ||  || — || March 27, 2011 || Mount Lemmon || Mount Lemmon Survey || — || align=right | 3.4 km || 
|-id=800 bgcolor=#fefefe
| 473800 ||  || — || November 1, 2010 || Mount Lemmon || Mount Lemmon Survey || — || align=right data-sort-value="0.80" | 800 m || 
|}

473801–473900 

|-bgcolor=#d6d6d6
| 473801 ||  || — || January 6, 2010 || Kitt Peak || Spacewatch || — || align=right | 3.0 km || 
|-id=802 bgcolor=#E9E9E9
| 473802 ||  || — || April 6, 2008 || Kitt Peak || Spacewatch || — || align=right | 1.4 km || 
|-id=803 bgcolor=#E9E9E9
| 473803 ||  || — || June 19, 2009 || Kitt Peak || Spacewatch || — || align=right | 1.6 km || 
|-id=804 bgcolor=#E9E9E9
| 473804 ||  || — || February 17, 2007 || Kitt Peak || Spacewatch || — || align=right | 1.3 km || 
|-id=805 bgcolor=#fefefe
| 473805 ||  || — || November 13, 2007 || Mount Lemmon || Mount Lemmon Survey || — || align=right data-sort-value="0.81" | 810 m || 
|-id=806 bgcolor=#fefefe
| 473806 ||  || — || March 1, 2009 || Kitt Peak || Spacewatch || — || align=right data-sort-value="0.91" | 910 m || 
|-id=807 bgcolor=#d6d6d6
| 473807 ||  || — || February 15, 2010 || WISE || WISE || — || align=right | 3.9 km || 
|-id=808 bgcolor=#d6d6d6
| 473808 ||  || — || January 6, 2010 || Kitt Peak || Spacewatch || — || align=right | 3.0 km || 
|-id=809 bgcolor=#d6d6d6
| 473809 ||  || — || October 4, 2007 || Kitt Peak || Spacewatch || — || align=right | 5.3 km || 
|-id=810 bgcolor=#E9E9E9
| 473810 ||  || — || November 25, 2005 || Mount Lemmon || Mount Lemmon Survey || AEO || align=right | 1.0 km || 
|-id=811 bgcolor=#fefefe
| 473811 ||  || — || December 1, 2008 || Mount Lemmon || Mount Lemmon Survey || — || align=right data-sort-value="0.80" | 800 m || 
|-id=812 bgcolor=#d6d6d6
| 473812 ||  || — || September 22, 2008 || Kitt Peak || Spacewatch || — || align=right | 2.7 km || 
|-id=813 bgcolor=#fefefe
| 473813 ||  || — || September 16, 2003 || Kitt Peak || Spacewatch || — || align=right data-sort-value="0.78" | 780 m || 
|-id=814 bgcolor=#E9E9E9
| 473814 ||  || — || March 14, 2007 || Anderson Mesa || LONEOS || — || align=right | 3.1 km || 
|-id=815 bgcolor=#E9E9E9
| 473815 ||  || — || September 21, 2009 || Mount Lemmon || Mount Lemmon Survey || NEM || align=right | 2.4 km || 
|-id=816 bgcolor=#d6d6d6
| 473816 ||  || — || February 19, 2010 || Mount Lemmon || Mount Lemmon Survey || — || align=right | 2.7 km || 
|-id=817 bgcolor=#d6d6d6
| 473817 ||  || — || December 17, 2009 || Mount Lemmon || Mount Lemmon Survey || — || align=right | 3.0 km || 
|-id=818 bgcolor=#d6d6d6
| 473818 ||  || — || September 11, 2007 || Mount Lemmon || Mount Lemmon Survey || — || align=right | 3.6 km || 
|-id=819 bgcolor=#d6d6d6
| 473819 ||  || — || February 2, 2006 || Mount Lemmon || Mount Lemmon Survey || KOR || align=right | 1.1 km || 
|-id=820 bgcolor=#E9E9E9
| 473820 ||  || — || March 11, 2008 || Mount Lemmon || Mount Lemmon Survey || — || align=right data-sort-value="0.94" | 940 m || 
|-id=821 bgcolor=#d6d6d6
| 473821 ||  || — || February 9, 2005 || Kitt Peak || Spacewatch || THM || align=right | 2.6 km || 
|-id=822 bgcolor=#d6d6d6
| 473822 ||  || — || May 2, 2006 || Kitt Peak || Spacewatch || — || align=right | 2.9 km || 
|-id=823 bgcolor=#d6d6d6
| 473823 ||  || — || June 10, 2007 || Kitt Peak || Spacewatch || — || align=right | 2.9 km || 
|-id=824 bgcolor=#d6d6d6
| 473824 ||  || — || March 3, 2005 || Catalina || CSS || — || align=right | 3.3 km || 
|-id=825 bgcolor=#fefefe
| 473825 ||  || — || April 30, 2013 || Kitt Peak || Spacewatch || — || align=right data-sort-value="0.59" | 590 m || 
|-id=826 bgcolor=#d6d6d6
| 473826 ||  || — || March 22, 2010 || WISE || WISE || — || align=right | 2.1 km || 
|-id=827 bgcolor=#d6d6d6
| 473827 ||  || — || August 24, 2007 || Kitt Peak || Spacewatch || — || align=right | 5.7 km || 
|-id=828 bgcolor=#d6d6d6
| 473828 ||  || — || March 23, 2004 || Kitt Peak || Spacewatch || 7:4 || align=right | 3.7 km || 
|-id=829 bgcolor=#d6d6d6
| 473829 ||  || — || May 21, 2012 || Mount Lemmon || Mount Lemmon Survey || — || align=right | 2.7 km || 
|-id=830 bgcolor=#E9E9E9
| 473830 ||  || — || October 18, 2009 || Mount Lemmon || Mount Lemmon Survey || AGN || align=right | 1.0 km || 
|-id=831 bgcolor=#d6d6d6
| 473831 ||  || — || February 16, 2010 || Mount Lemmon || Mount Lemmon Survey || — || align=right | 3.1 km || 
|-id=832 bgcolor=#E9E9E9
| 473832 ||  || — || September 23, 2009 || Kitt Peak || Spacewatch || — || align=right | 2.0 km || 
|-id=833 bgcolor=#E9E9E9
| 473833 ||  || — || November 30, 2005 || Kitt Peak || Spacewatch || PAD || align=right | 1.6 km || 
|-id=834 bgcolor=#fefefe
| 473834 ||  || — || November 18, 2003 || Kitt Peak || Spacewatch || — || align=right data-sort-value="0.91" | 910 m || 
|-id=835 bgcolor=#d6d6d6
| 473835 ||  || — || September 19, 2008 || Kitt Peak || Spacewatch || — || align=right | 2.4 km || 
|-id=836 bgcolor=#E9E9E9
| 473836 ||  || — || September 3, 2008 || Kitt Peak || Spacewatch || — || align=right | 2.2 km || 
|-id=837 bgcolor=#d6d6d6
| 473837 ||  || — || January 8, 2010 || Mount Lemmon || Mount Lemmon Survey || — || align=right | 2.4 km || 
|-id=838 bgcolor=#d6d6d6
| 473838 ||  || — || April 17, 2010 || WISE || WISE || — || align=right | 2.6 km || 
|-id=839 bgcolor=#E9E9E9
| 473839 ||  || — || April 12, 2004 || Kitt Peak || Spacewatch || — || align=right | 1.0 km || 
|-id=840 bgcolor=#d6d6d6
| 473840 ||  || — || September 2, 2013 || Mount Lemmon || Mount Lemmon Survey || KOR || align=right | 1.3 km || 
|-id=841 bgcolor=#E9E9E9
| 473841 ||  || — || November 11, 2001 || Kitt Peak || Spacewatch || — || align=right | 1.5 km || 
|-id=842 bgcolor=#d6d6d6
| 473842 ||  || — || October 1, 2013 || Mount Lemmon || Mount Lemmon Survey || HYG || align=right | 2.5 km || 
|-id=843 bgcolor=#d6d6d6
| 473843 ||  || — || October 10, 1999 || Kitt Peak || Spacewatch || KOR || align=right | 1.3 km || 
|-id=844 bgcolor=#fefefe
| 473844 ||  || — || March 9, 2005 || Mount Lemmon || Mount Lemmon Survey || — || align=right data-sort-value="0.73" | 730 m || 
|-id=845 bgcolor=#d6d6d6
| 473845 ||  || — || March 8, 2005 || Mount Lemmon || Mount Lemmon Survey || — || align=right | 3.7 km || 
|-id=846 bgcolor=#d6d6d6
| 473846 ||  || — || September 30, 2003 || Kitt Peak || Spacewatch || KOR || align=right | 1.4 km || 
|-id=847 bgcolor=#fefefe
| 473847 ||  || — || December 29, 2003 || Kitt Peak || Spacewatch || V || align=right data-sort-value="0.48" | 480 m || 
|-id=848 bgcolor=#E9E9E9
| 473848 ||  || — || March 26, 2007 || Kitt Peak || Spacewatch || — || align=right | 1.7 km || 
|-id=849 bgcolor=#d6d6d6
| 473849 ||  || — || October 4, 2013 || Mount Lemmon || Mount Lemmon Survey || — || align=right | 2.6 km || 
|-id=850 bgcolor=#d6d6d6
| 473850 ||  || — || September 10, 2007 || Mount Lemmon || Mount Lemmon Survey || — || align=right | 2.9 km || 
|-id=851 bgcolor=#d6d6d6
| 473851 ||  || — || March 8, 2005 || Mount Lemmon || Mount Lemmon Survey || — || align=right | 3.7 km || 
|-id=852 bgcolor=#E9E9E9
| 473852 ||  || — || July 1, 2005 || Kitt Peak || Spacewatch || — || align=right data-sort-value="0.88" | 880 m || 
|-id=853 bgcolor=#fefefe
| 473853 ||  || — || March 14, 2005 || Mount Lemmon || Mount Lemmon Survey || — || align=right data-sort-value="0.69" | 690 m || 
|-id=854 bgcolor=#fefefe
| 473854 ||  || — || November 16, 2003 || Kitt Peak || Spacewatch || — || align=right data-sort-value="0.61" | 610 m || 
|-id=855 bgcolor=#fefefe
| 473855 ||  || — || April 13, 2001 || Kitt Peak || Spacewatch || — || align=right data-sort-value="0.83" | 830 m || 
|-id=856 bgcolor=#E9E9E9
| 473856 ||  || — || October 4, 2004 || Kitt Peak || Spacewatch || — || align=right | 2.4 km || 
|-id=857 bgcolor=#fefefe
| 473857 ||  || — || January 27, 2006 || Mount Lemmon || Mount Lemmon Survey || — || align=right data-sort-value="0.68" | 680 m || 
|-id=858 bgcolor=#d6d6d6
| 473858 ||  || — || September 18, 2003 || Kitt Peak || Spacewatch || — || align=right | 2.2 km || 
|-id=859 bgcolor=#E9E9E9
| 473859 ||  || — || August 27, 2009 || Kitt Peak || Spacewatch || — || align=right data-sort-value="0.79" | 790 m || 
|-id=860 bgcolor=#fefefe
| 473860 ||  || — || January 26, 2006 || Kitt Peak || Spacewatch || — || align=right data-sort-value="0.58" | 580 m || 
|-id=861 bgcolor=#d6d6d6
| 473861 ||  || — || January 18, 2015 || Mount Lemmon || Mount Lemmon Survey || (6124)3:2 || align=right | 3.5 km || 
|-id=862 bgcolor=#d6d6d6
| 473862 ||  || — || May 18, 2010 || WISE || WISE || — || align=right | 3.8 km || 
|-id=863 bgcolor=#E9E9E9
| 473863 ||  || — || April 20, 2004 || Kitt Peak || Spacewatch || — || align=right data-sort-value="0.79" | 790 m || 
|-id=864 bgcolor=#E9E9E9
| 473864 ||  || — || March 26, 2007 || Mount Lemmon || Mount Lemmon Survey || NEM || align=right | 2.2 km || 
|-id=865 bgcolor=#E9E9E9
| 473865 ||  || — || February 26, 2012 || Kitt Peak || Spacewatch || — || align=right | 1.2 km || 
|-id=866 bgcolor=#E9E9E9
| 473866 ||  || — || September 23, 2004 || Kitt Peak || Spacewatch || — || align=right | 1.2 km || 
|-id=867 bgcolor=#E9E9E9
| 473867 ||  || — || October 9, 2004 || Kitt Peak || Spacewatch || AGN || align=right | 1.4 km || 
|-id=868 bgcolor=#d6d6d6
| 473868 ||  || — || October 2, 2008 || Kitt Peak || Spacewatch || KOR || align=right | 1.4 km || 
|-id=869 bgcolor=#d6d6d6
| 473869 ||  || — || September 11, 2007 || XuYi || PMO NEO || — || align=right | 3.1 km || 
|-id=870 bgcolor=#d6d6d6
| 473870 ||  || — || May 3, 2006 || Mount Lemmon || Mount Lemmon Survey || — || align=right | 2.1 km || 
|-id=871 bgcolor=#E9E9E9
| 473871 ||  || — || October 5, 2004 || Kitt Peak || Spacewatch || — || align=right | 2.7 km || 
|-id=872 bgcolor=#d6d6d6
| 473872 ||  || — || September 9, 2007 || Mount Lemmon || Mount Lemmon Survey || THM || align=right | 2.0 km || 
|-id=873 bgcolor=#d6d6d6
| 473873 ||  || — || April 11, 2005 || Mount Lemmon || Mount Lemmon Survey || — || align=right | 2.3 km || 
|-id=874 bgcolor=#E9E9E9
| 473874 ||  || — || December 31, 2005 || Kitt Peak || Spacewatch ||  || align=right | 1.8 km || 
|-id=875 bgcolor=#d6d6d6
| 473875 ||  || — || March 28, 2010 || WISE || WISE || — || align=right | 2.3 km || 
|-id=876 bgcolor=#fefefe
| 473876 ||  || — || January 31, 2009 || Mount Lemmon || Mount Lemmon Survey || — || align=right data-sort-value="0.87" | 870 m || 
|-id=877 bgcolor=#d6d6d6
| 473877 ||  || — || August 30, 2002 || Kitt Peak || Spacewatch || HYG || align=right | 2.4 km || 
|-id=878 bgcolor=#E9E9E9
| 473878 ||  || — || October 12, 2006 || Kitt Peak || Spacewatch || — || align=right data-sort-value="0.85" | 850 m || 
|-id=879 bgcolor=#fefefe
| 473879 ||  || — || January 14, 2008 || Kitt Peak || Spacewatch || — || align=right data-sort-value="0.80" | 800 m || 
|-id=880 bgcolor=#fefefe
| 473880 ||  || — || November 25, 2006 || Kitt Peak || Spacewatch || — || align=right data-sort-value="0.82" | 820 m || 
|-id=881 bgcolor=#fefefe
| 473881 ||  || — || February 27, 2009 || Kitt Peak || Spacewatch || — || align=right data-sort-value="0.65" | 650 m || 
|-id=882 bgcolor=#fefefe
| 473882 ||  || — || March 17, 2005 || Kitt Peak || Spacewatch || — || align=right data-sort-value="0.59" | 590 m || 
|-id=883 bgcolor=#d6d6d6
| 473883 ||  || — || October 8, 2008 || Mount Lemmon || Mount Lemmon Survey || — || align=right | 2.5 km || 
|-id=884 bgcolor=#E9E9E9
| 473884 ||  || — || March 17, 2007 || Kitt Peak || Spacewatch || — || align=right | 2.4 km || 
|-id=885 bgcolor=#fefefe
| 473885 ||  || — || October 2, 2003 || Kitt Peak || Spacewatch || — || align=right data-sort-value="0.89" | 890 m || 
|-id=886 bgcolor=#d6d6d6
| 473886 ||  || — || February 27, 2006 || Kitt Peak || Spacewatch || KOR || align=right | 1.4 km || 
|-id=887 bgcolor=#E9E9E9
| 473887 ||  || — || January 25, 2006 || Kitt Peak || Spacewatch || — || align=right | 1.9 km || 
|-id=888 bgcolor=#d6d6d6
| 473888 ||  || — || April 2, 2005 || Mount Lemmon || Mount Lemmon Survey || THM || align=right | 2.0 km || 
|-id=889 bgcolor=#d6d6d6
| 473889 ||  || — || October 8, 2007 || Mount Lemmon || Mount Lemmon Survey || — || align=right | 2.6 km || 
|-id=890 bgcolor=#fefefe
| 473890 ||  || — || September 18, 2006 || Kitt Peak || Spacewatch || — || align=right data-sort-value="0.89" | 890 m || 
|-id=891 bgcolor=#d6d6d6
| 473891 ||  || — || October 2, 2013 || Mount Lemmon || Mount Lemmon Survey || — || align=right | 2.5 km || 
|-id=892 bgcolor=#fefefe
| 473892 ||  || — || April 18, 2009 || Kitt Peak || Spacewatch || V || align=right data-sort-value="0.56" | 560 m || 
|-id=893 bgcolor=#E9E9E9
| 473893 ||  || — || January 9, 1997 || Kitt Peak || Spacewatch || AGN || align=right | 1.3 km || 
|-id=894 bgcolor=#fefefe
| 473894 ||  || — || October 9, 2010 || Mount Lemmon || Mount Lemmon Survey || — || align=right data-sort-value="0.71" | 710 m || 
|-id=895 bgcolor=#E9E9E9
| 473895 ||  || — || December 31, 2005 || Kitt Peak || Spacewatch || AGN || align=right | 1.2 km || 
|-id=896 bgcolor=#fefefe
| 473896 ||  || — || October 8, 2007 || Mount Lemmon || Mount Lemmon Survey || — || align=right data-sort-value="0.81" | 810 m || 
|-id=897 bgcolor=#d6d6d6
| 473897 ||  || — || September 13, 2007 || Mount Lemmon || Mount Lemmon Survey || — || align=right | 3.1 km || 
|-id=898 bgcolor=#d6d6d6
| 473898 ||  || — || September 29, 2008 || Catalina || CSS || — || align=right | 2.7 km || 
|-id=899 bgcolor=#fefefe
| 473899 ||  || — || March 18, 2009 || Catalina || CSS || — || align=right | 2.0 km || 
|-id=900 bgcolor=#E9E9E9
| 473900 ||  || — || April 13, 2008 || Kitt Peak || Spacewatch || — || align=right | 1.2 km || 
|}

473901–474000 

|-bgcolor=#E9E9E9
| 473901 ||  || — || January 17, 2007 || Kitt Peak || Spacewatch || — || align=right | 1.3 km || 
|-id=902 bgcolor=#fefefe
| 473902 ||  || — || December 20, 1995 || Kitt Peak || Spacewatch || — || align=right data-sort-value="0.64" | 640 m || 
|-id=903 bgcolor=#d6d6d6
| 473903 ||  || — || November 2, 2008 || Mount Lemmon || Mount Lemmon Survey || — || align=right | 2.5 km || 
|-id=904 bgcolor=#d6d6d6
| 473904 ||  || — || March 3, 2000 || Socorro || LINEAR || — || align=right | 3.4 km || 
|-id=905 bgcolor=#E9E9E9
| 473905 ||  || — || October 23, 2009 || Mount Lemmon || Mount Lemmon Survey || — || align=right | 1.9 km || 
|-id=906 bgcolor=#d6d6d6
| 473906 ||  || — || October 30, 2008 || Kitt Peak || Spacewatch || EOS || align=right | 2.4 km || 
|-id=907 bgcolor=#fefefe
| 473907 ||  || — || February 27, 2006 || Kitt Peak || Spacewatch || — || align=right data-sort-value="0.72" | 720 m || 
|-id=908 bgcolor=#E9E9E9
| 473908 ||  || — || October 10, 2004 || Kitt Peak || Spacewatch || — || align=right | 2.3 km || 
|-id=909 bgcolor=#fefefe
| 473909 ||  || — || November 17, 2011 || Mount Lemmon || Mount Lemmon Survey || — || align=right data-sort-value="0.62" | 620 m || 
|-id=910 bgcolor=#E9E9E9
| 473910 ||  || — || September 23, 2005 || Kitt Peak || Spacewatch || — || align=right | 1.0 km || 
|-id=911 bgcolor=#d6d6d6
| 473911 ||  || — || November 3, 2008 || Kitt Peak || Spacewatch || — || align=right | 2.5 km || 
|-id=912 bgcolor=#fefefe
| 473912 ||  || — || February 1, 2006 || Mount Lemmon || Mount Lemmon Survey || — || align=right data-sort-value="0.65" | 650 m || 
|-id=913 bgcolor=#E9E9E9
| 473913 ||  || — || January 29, 2011 || Mount Lemmon || Mount Lemmon Survey || — || align=right data-sort-value="0.93" | 930 m || 
|-id=914 bgcolor=#d6d6d6
| 473914 ||  || — || March 12, 2005 || Kitt Peak || Spacewatch || — || align=right | 3.0 km || 
|-id=915 bgcolor=#E9E9E9
| 473915 ||  || — || April 15, 2008 || Mount Lemmon || Mount Lemmon Survey || — || align=right | 1.7 km || 
|-id=916 bgcolor=#d6d6d6
| 473916 ||  || — || April 1, 2005 || Kitt Peak || Spacewatch || — || align=right | 3.3 km || 
|-id=917 bgcolor=#d6d6d6
| 473917 ||  || — || March 4, 2006 || Mount Lemmon || Mount Lemmon Survey || — || align=right | 3.0 km || 
|-id=918 bgcolor=#d6d6d6
| 473918 ||  || — || September 10, 2007 || Kitt Peak || Spacewatch || — || align=right | 3.4 km || 
|-id=919 bgcolor=#E9E9E9
| 473919 ||  || — || September 29, 2009 || Mount Lemmon || Mount Lemmon Survey || — || align=right | 2.2 km || 
|-id=920 bgcolor=#fefefe
| 473920 ||  || — || October 18, 2003 || Kitt Peak || Spacewatch || — || align=right data-sort-value="0.72" | 720 m || 
|-id=921 bgcolor=#d6d6d6
| 473921 ||  || — || March 25, 2006 || Kitt Peak || Spacewatch || — || align=right | 2.9 km || 
|-id=922 bgcolor=#d6d6d6
| 473922 ||  || — || October 30, 2008 || Kitt Peak || Spacewatch || — || align=right | 2.6 km || 
|-id=923 bgcolor=#d6d6d6
| 473923 ||  || — || April 11, 1999 || Kitt Peak || Spacewatch || THM || align=right | 2.2 km || 
|-id=924 bgcolor=#d6d6d6
| 473924 ||  || — || February 27, 2006 || Kitt Peak || Spacewatch || KOR || align=right | 1.5 km || 
|-id=925 bgcolor=#E9E9E9
| 473925 ||  || — || October 3, 1999 || Kitt Peak || Spacewatch || — || align=right | 2.2 km || 
|-id=926 bgcolor=#fefefe
| 473926 ||  || — || January 28, 2004 || Kitt Peak || Spacewatch || — || align=right data-sort-value="0.68" | 680 m || 
|-id=927 bgcolor=#E9E9E9
| 473927 ||  || — || October 18, 2006 || Kitt Peak || Spacewatch || — || align=right data-sort-value="0.78" | 780 m || 
|-id=928 bgcolor=#d6d6d6
| 473928 ||  || — || October 3, 2013 || Kitt Peak || Spacewatch || — || align=right | 3.2 km || 
|-id=929 bgcolor=#E9E9E9
| 473929 ||  || — || October 1, 2005 || Kitt Peak || Spacewatch || — || align=right | 1.2 km || 
|-id=930 bgcolor=#d6d6d6
| 473930 ||  || — || November 19, 2009 || Mount Lemmon || Mount Lemmon Survey || — || align=right | 3.6 km || 
|-id=931 bgcolor=#E9E9E9
| 473931 ||  || — || September 25, 2006 || Kitt Peak || Spacewatch || — || align=right data-sort-value="0.98" | 980 m || 
|-id=932 bgcolor=#d6d6d6
| 473932 ||  || — || February 3, 2000 || Kitt Peak || Spacewatch || — || align=right | 2.8 km || 
|-id=933 bgcolor=#d6d6d6
| 473933 ||  || — || March 3, 2005 || Catalina || CSS || — || align=right | 4.2 km || 
|-id=934 bgcolor=#d6d6d6
| 473934 ||  || — || October 18, 2003 || Kitt Peak || Spacewatch || EOS || align=right | 2.2 km || 
|-id=935 bgcolor=#d6d6d6
| 473935 ||  || — || September 14, 2002 || Kitt Peak || Spacewatch || — || align=right | 4.1 km || 
|-id=936 bgcolor=#d6d6d6
| 473936 ||  || — || November 20, 2003 || Kitt Peak || Spacewatch || EOS || align=right | 1.8 km || 
|-id=937 bgcolor=#d6d6d6
| 473937 ||  || — || November 8, 2008 || Mount Lemmon || Mount Lemmon Survey || THM || align=right | 1.9 km || 
|-id=938 bgcolor=#d6d6d6
| 473938 ||  || — || April 12, 2011 || Mount Lemmon || Mount Lemmon Survey || EOS || align=right | 1.7 km || 
|-id=939 bgcolor=#d6d6d6
| 473939 ||  || — || September 3, 2008 || Kitt Peak || Spacewatch || — || align=right | 3.5 km || 
|-id=940 bgcolor=#E9E9E9
| 473940 ||  || — || September 26, 2009 || Kitt Peak || Spacewatch || AGN || align=right data-sort-value="0.81" | 810 m || 
|-id=941 bgcolor=#E9E9E9
| 473941 ||  || — || October 27, 2005 || Kitt Peak || Spacewatch || — || align=right | 1.2 km || 
|-id=942 bgcolor=#d6d6d6
| 473942 ||  || — || November 20, 2003 || Kitt Peak || Spacewatch || EOS || align=right | 3.5 km || 
|-id=943 bgcolor=#fefefe
| 473943 ||  || — || February 3, 2009 || Kitt Peak || Spacewatch || — || align=right data-sort-value="0.72" | 720 m || 
|-id=944 bgcolor=#E9E9E9
| 473944 ||  || — || June 7, 2008 || Kitt Peak || Spacewatch || — || align=right | 1.4 km || 
|-id=945 bgcolor=#E9E9E9
| 473945 ||  || — || March 13, 2007 || Catalina || CSS || — || align=right | 3.1 km || 
|-id=946 bgcolor=#E9E9E9
| 473946 ||  || — || August 28, 2005 || Kitt Peak || Spacewatch || — || align=right data-sort-value="0.75" | 750 m || 
|-id=947 bgcolor=#d6d6d6
| 473947 ||  || — || November 6, 2008 || Mount Lemmon || Mount Lemmon Survey || — || align=right | 2.7 km || 
|-id=948 bgcolor=#fefefe
| 473948 ||  || — || January 29, 1998 || Kitt Peak || Spacewatch || — || align=right data-sort-value="0.61" | 610 m || 
|-id=949 bgcolor=#d6d6d6
| 473949 ||  || — || October 10, 2007 || Kitt Peak || Spacewatch || — || align=right | 3.2 km || 
|-id=950 bgcolor=#d6d6d6
| 473950 ||  || — || September 21, 2008 || Mount Lemmon || Mount Lemmon Survey || KOR || align=right | 1.1 km || 
|-id=951 bgcolor=#d6d6d6
| 473951 ||  || — || September 14, 2007 || Mount Lemmon || Mount Lemmon Survey || — || align=right | 2.7 km || 
|-id=952 bgcolor=#fefefe
| 473952 ||  || — || October 10, 2010 || Kitt Peak || Spacewatch || — || align=right data-sort-value="0.71" | 710 m || 
|-id=953 bgcolor=#fefefe
| 473953 ||  || — || March 17, 2005 || Kitt Peak || Spacewatch || — || align=right data-sort-value="0.77" | 770 m || 
|-id=954 bgcolor=#d6d6d6
| 473954 ||  || — || January 30, 2006 || Kitt Peak || Spacewatch || KOR || align=right | 1.4 km || 
|-id=955 bgcolor=#E9E9E9
| 473955 ||  || — || October 2, 1999 || Kitt Peak || Spacewatch || — || align=right | 2.2 km || 
|-id=956 bgcolor=#E9E9E9
| 473956 ||  || — || March 27, 2003 || Kitt Peak || Spacewatch || — || align=right | 1.3 km || 
|-id=957 bgcolor=#E9E9E9
| 473957 ||  || — || March 29, 2012 || Mount Lemmon || Mount Lemmon Survey || — || align=right | 1.5 km || 
|-id=958 bgcolor=#E9E9E9
| 473958 ||  || — || March 27, 2003 || Kitt Peak || Spacewatch || — || align=right | 1.4 km || 
|-id=959 bgcolor=#E9E9E9
| 473959 ||  || — || March 17, 2002 || Kitt Peak || Spacewatch || — || align=right | 1.9 km || 
|-id=960 bgcolor=#E9E9E9
| 473960 ||  || — || December 8, 2010 || Mount Lemmon || Mount Lemmon Survey || — || align=right | 1.8 km || 
|-id=961 bgcolor=#fefefe
| 473961 ||  || — || March 10, 2005 || Mount Lemmon || Mount Lemmon Survey || — || align=right data-sort-value="0.85" | 850 m || 
|-id=962 bgcolor=#E9E9E9
| 473962 ||  || — || December 25, 2010 || Mount Lemmon || Mount Lemmon Survey || — || align=right | 1.6 km || 
|-id=963 bgcolor=#d6d6d6
| 473963 ||  || — || October 29, 2008 || Kitt Peak || Spacewatch || EOS || align=right | 2.6 km || 
|-id=964 bgcolor=#d6d6d6
| 473964 ||  || — || January 10, 2010 || Kitt Peak || Spacewatch || — || align=right | 5.1 km || 
|-id=965 bgcolor=#fefefe
| 473965 ||  || — || January 2, 2012 || Mount Lemmon || Mount Lemmon Survey || — || align=right data-sort-value="0.78" | 780 m || 
|-id=966 bgcolor=#d6d6d6
| 473966 ||  || — || December 18, 2004 || Mount Lemmon || Mount Lemmon Survey || EOS || align=right | 1.9 km || 
|-id=967 bgcolor=#fefefe
| 473967 ||  || — || May 11, 2002 || Socorro || LINEAR || — || align=right data-sort-value="0.77" | 770 m || 
|-id=968 bgcolor=#d6d6d6
| 473968 ||  || — || January 7, 2010 || Kitt Peak || Spacewatch || — || align=right | 2.5 km || 
|-id=969 bgcolor=#E9E9E9
| 473969 ||  || — || February 9, 2002 || Kitt Peak || Spacewatch || — || align=right | 2.3 km || 
|-id=970 bgcolor=#E9E9E9
| 473970 ||  || — || March 14, 2007 || Catalina || CSS || — || align=right | 3.7 km || 
|-id=971 bgcolor=#fefefe
| 473971 ||  || — || December 28, 2011 || Mount Lemmon || Mount Lemmon Survey || — || align=right data-sort-value="0.71" | 710 m || 
|-id=972 bgcolor=#E9E9E9
| 473972 ||  || — || April 29, 2008 || Mount Lemmon || Mount Lemmon Survey || BRG || align=right | 1.4 km || 
|-id=973 bgcolor=#E9E9E9
| 473973 ||  || — || April 18, 2012 || Kitt Peak || Spacewatch || EUN || align=right | 1.0 km || 
|-id=974 bgcolor=#E9E9E9
| 473974 ||  || — || February 5, 2011 || Catalina || CSS || — || align=right | 2.4 km || 
|-id=975 bgcolor=#d6d6d6
| 473975 ||  || — || May 24, 2010 || WISE || WISE || EOS || align=right | 3.0 km || 
|-id=976 bgcolor=#d6d6d6
| 473976 ||  || — || January 17, 2010 || Kitt Peak || Spacewatch || VER || align=right | 2.8 km || 
|-id=977 bgcolor=#d6d6d6
| 473977 ||  || — || February 1, 2005 || Kitt Peak || Spacewatch || — || align=right | 2.8 km || 
|-id=978 bgcolor=#d6d6d6
| 473978 ||  || — || March 16, 2005 || Catalina || CSS || — || align=right | 4.0 km || 
|-id=979 bgcolor=#d6d6d6
| 473979 ||  || — || April 18, 2005 || Catalina || CSS || — || align=right | 4.2 km || 
|-id=980 bgcolor=#d6d6d6
| 473980 ||  || — || February 9, 2010 || Catalina || CSS || — || align=right | 4.0 km || 
|-id=981 bgcolor=#d6d6d6
| 473981 ||  || — || September 30, 2008 || Mount Lemmon || Mount Lemmon Survey || — || align=right | 4.3 km || 
|-id=982 bgcolor=#E9E9E9
| 473982 ||  || — || August 15, 2009 || Kitt Peak || Spacewatch || — || align=right | 2.7 km || 
|-id=983 bgcolor=#E9E9E9
| 473983 ||  || — || March 9, 2007 || Mount Lemmon || Mount Lemmon Survey || — || align=right | 1.9 km || 
|-id=984 bgcolor=#fefefe
| 473984 ||  || — || October 12, 2007 || Kitt Peak || Spacewatch || — || align=right data-sort-value="0.68" | 680 m || 
|-id=985 bgcolor=#fefefe
| 473985 ||  || — || October 15, 2007 || Mount Lemmon || Mount Lemmon Survey || V || align=right data-sort-value="0.58" | 580 m || 
|-id=986 bgcolor=#fefefe
| 473986 ||  || — || January 21, 2012 || Kitt Peak || Spacewatch || — || align=right data-sort-value="0.78" | 780 m || 
|-id=987 bgcolor=#E9E9E9
| 473987 ||  || — || March 19, 2007 || Mount Lemmon || Mount Lemmon Survey || — || align=right | 2.5 km || 
|-id=988 bgcolor=#fefefe
| 473988 ||  || — || December 27, 2005 || Kitt Peak || Spacewatch || — || align=right data-sort-value="0.59" | 590 m || 
|-id=989 bgcolor=#E9E9E9
| 473989 ||  || — || October 10, 2004 || Kitt Peak || Spacewatch || — || align=right | 2.2 km || 
|-id=990 bgcolor=#d6d6d6
| 473990 ||  || — || June 3, 2010 || WISE || WISE || — || align=right | 4.2 km || 
|-id=991 bgcolor=#d6d6d6
| 473991 ||  || — || October 25, 2008 || Mount Lemmon || Mount Lemmon Survey || HYG || align=right | 2.5 km || 
|-id=992 bgcolor=#fefefe
| 473992 ||  || — || March 23, 2006 || Kitt Peak || Spacewatch || — || align=right data-sort-value="0.85" | 850 m || 
|-id=993 bgcolor=#d6d6d6
| 473993 ||  || — || April 24, 2000 || Kitt Peak || Spacewatch || — || align=right | 3.0 km || 
|-id=994 bgcolor=#d6d6d6
| 473994 ||  || — || March 8, 2005 || Catalina || CSS || — || align=right | 3.0 km || 
|-id=995 bgcolor=#d6d6d6
| 473995 ||  || — || January 11, 2010 || Kitt Peak || Spacewatch || LIX || align=right | 3.1 km || 
|-id=996 bgcolor=#d6d6d6
| 473996 ||  || — || December 15, 2004 || Kitt Peak || Spacewatch || — || align=right | 3.4 km || 
|-id=997 bgcolor=#fefefe
| 473997 ||  || — || March 9, 2005 || Socorro || LINEAR || — || align=right data-sort-value="0.85" | 850 m || 
|-id=998 bgcolor=#E9E9E9
| 473998 ||  || — || September 21, 1996 || Kitt Peak || Spacewatch || (5) || align=right data-sort-value="0.75" | 750 m || 
|-id=999 bgcolor=#E9E9E9
| 473999 ||  || — || October 1, 2005 || Mount Lemmon || Mount Lemmon Survey || — || align=right data-sort-value="0.94" | 940 m || 
|-id=000 bgcolor=#d6d6d6
| 474000 ||  || — || September 23, 2008 || Kitt Peak || Spacewatch || EOS || align=right | 1.4 km || 
|}

References

External links 
 Discovery Circumstances: Numbered Minor Planets (470001)–(475000) (IAU Minor Planet Center)

0473